George Orson Welles (May 6, 1915 – October 10, 1985) was an American actor, director, producer, and screenwriter who is remembered for his innovative work in film, radio, and theatre. He is considered to be among the greatest and most influential filmmakers of all time.

While in his 20s, Welles directed high-profile stage productions for the Federal Theatre Project, including an adaptation of Macbeth with an entirely African-American cast and the political musical The Cradle Will Rock. In 1937, he and John Houseman founded the Mercury Theatre, an independent repertory theatre company that presented a series of productions on Broadway through 1941, including Caesar (1937), a modern, politically charged adaptation of Shakespeare's Julius Caesar.

In 1938, his radio anthology series The Mercury Theatre on the Air gave Welles the platform to find international fame as the director and narrator of a radio adaptation of H. G. Wells's novel The War of the Worlds, which caused some listeners to believe that a Martian invasion was in fact occurring. Although reports of panic were mostly false and overstated, they rocketed 23-year-old Welles to notoriety.

His first film was Citizen Kane (1941), which is consistently ranked as one of the greatest films ever made and which he co-wrote, produced, directed and starred in as the title character, Charles Foster Kane. Welles released twelve other features, the most acclaimed of which include The Magnificent Ambersons (1942), The Lady from Shanghai (1947), Touch of Evil (1958), The Trial (1962), Chimes at Midnight (1966) and F for Fake (1973). His distinctive directorial style featured layered and nonlinear narrative forms, dramatic lighting, unusual camera angles, sound techniques borrowed from radio, deep focus shots and long takes. David Thomson credits Welles with "the creation of a visual style that is simultaneously baroque and precise, overwhelmingly emotional, and unerringly founded in reality." He has been praised as "the ultimate auteur". Among Welles's notable roles in films by other directors are Rochester in Jane Eyre (1943), Harry Lime in The Third Man (1949) and Cardinal Wolsey in A Man for All Seasons (1966). Welles was a lifelong lover of Shakespeare, and Peter Bogdanovich writes that Chimes at Midnight, in which Welles plays John Falstaff, is "arguably his best film, and his own personal favorite"; Joseph McBride and Jonathan Rosenbaum have called it Welles's masterpiece, and Vincent Canby wrote "it may be the greatest Shakespearean film ever made."

Welles was an outsider to the studio system and struggled for creative control on his projects early on with the major film studios in Hollywood and later in life with a variety of independent financiers across Europe, where he spent most of his career. Many of his films were either heavily edited or remained unreleased; after Welles went to South America to film the documentary It's All True, RKO cut more than forty minutes from Ambersons and added a happier ending, against his wishes. The missing footage from Ambersons has been called a "holy grail" of cinema. Welles wrote a 58-page memo to Universal about the editing of Touch of Evil, which they disregarded. In 1998, Walter Murch reedited the film according to Welles's specifications. With a development spanning almost 50 years, Welles's final film, The Other Side of the Wind, was posthumously released in 2018.

Welles had three marriages, including one with Rita Hayworth, and three children. Known for his baritone voice, Welles performed extensively across theatre, radio, and film. He was a lifelong magician, noted for presenting troop variety shows in the war years. He was a lifelong member of the International Brotherhood of Magicians and the Society of American Magicians.  In 2002, he was voted the greatest film director of all time in two British Film Institute polls among directors and critics. In 2018, he was included in the list of the 50 greatest Hollywood actors of all time by The Daily Telegraph. Micheál Mac Liammóir, who played Iago in Welles's Othello, said "Orson's courage, like everything else about him, imagination, egotism, generosity, ruthlessness, forbearance, impatience, sensitivity, grossness and vision is magnificently out of proportion."

Early life 

George Orson Welles was born May 6, 1915, in Kenosha, Wisconsin, a son of Richard Head Welles (1872–1930) and Beatrice Ives Welles (née Beatrice Lucy Ives; 1883–1924). He was named after one of his great-grandfathers, influential Kenosha attorney Orson S. Head, and his brother George Head. An alternative story of the source of his first and middle names was told by George Ade, who met Welles's parents on a West Indies cruise toward the end of 1914. Ade was traveling with a friend, Orson Wells (no relation), and the two of them sat at the same table as Mr. and Mrs. Richard Welles. Mrs. Welles was pregnant at the time, and when they said goodbye, she told them that she had enjoyed their company so much that if the child were a boy, she intended to name him after them: George Orson.

Despite his family's affluence, Welles encountered hardship in childhood. His parents separated and moved approximately 55 miles south to Chicago in 1919. His father, who made a fortune as the inventor of a popular bicycle lamp, became an alcoholic and stopped working. Welles's mother, a pianist who studied with Leopold Godowsky, played during lectures by Dudley Crafts Watson at the Art Institute of Chicago to support her son and herself; the older Welles boy, "Dickie", was institutionalized at an early age because he had learning difficulties. Beatrice died of hepatitis in a Chicago hospital on May 10, 1924, just after Welles's ninth birthday.  The Gordon String Quartet, a predecessor to the Berkshire String Quartet, which had made its first appearance at her home in 1921, played at Beatrice's funeral.

After his mother's death, Welles ceased pursuing music. It was decided that he would spend the summer with the Watson family at a private art colony established by Lydia Avery Coonley Ward in the village of Wyoming in the Finger Lakes Region of New York. There, he played and became friends with the children of the Aga Khan, including the 12-year-old Prince Aly Khan. Then, in what Welles later described as "a hectic period" in his life, he lived in a Chicago apartment with both his father and Maurice Bernstein, a Chicago physician who had been a close friend of both his parents. Welles briefly attended public school before his alcoholic father left business altogether and took him along on his travels to Jamaica and the Far East. When they returned, they settled in a hotel in Grand Detour, Illinois, that was owned by his father. When the hotel burned down, Welles and his father took to the road again.

"During the three years that Orson lived with his father, some observers wondered who took care of whom," wrote biographer Frank Brady.

"In some ways, he was never really a young boy, you know," said Roger Hill, who became Welles's teacher and lifelong friend.

Welles briefly attended public school in Madison, Wisconsin, enrolled in the fourth grade. On September 15, 1926, he entered the Todd Seminary for Boys, an expensive independent school in Woodstock, Illinois, that his older brother, Richard Ives Welles, had attended ten years before until he was expelled for misbehavior. At Todd School, Welles came under the influence of Roger Hill, a teacher who was later Todd's headmaster. Hill provided Welles with an ad hoc educational environment that proved invaluable to his creative experience, allowing Welles to concentrate on subjects that interested him. Welles performed and staged theatrical experiments and productions there.

"Todd provided Welles with many valuable experiences," wrote critic Richard France. "He was able to explore and experiment in an atmosphere of acceptance and encouragement. In addition to a theatre, the school's own radio station was at his disposal." Welles's first radio experience was on the Todd station, where he performed an adaptation of Sherlock Holmes that was written by him.

On December 28, 1930, when Welles was 15, his father died of heart and kidney failure at the age of 58, alone in a hotel in Chicago. Shortly before this, Welles had announced to his father that he would stop seeing him, believing it would prompt his father to refrain from drinking. As a result, Orson felt guilty because he believed his father had drunk himself to death because of him. His father's will left it to Orson to name his guardian. When Roger Hill declined, Welles chose Maurice Bernstein.

Following graduation from Todd in May 1931, Welles was awarded a scholarship to Harvard College, while his mentor Roger Hill advocated he attend Cornell College in Iowa. Rather than enrolling, he chose travel. He studied for a few weeks at the Art Institute of Chicago with Boris Anisfeld, who encouraged him to pursue painting.

Welles occasionally returned to Woodstock, the place he eventually named when he was asked in a 1960 interview, "Where is home?" Welles replied, "I suppose it's Woodstock, Illinois, if it's anywhere. I went to school there for four years. If I try to think of a home, it's that."

Early career (1931–1935) 

After his father's death, Welles traveled to Europe using a small portion of his inheritance. Welles said that while on a walking and painting trip through Ireland, he strode into the Gate Theatre in Dublin and claimed he was a Broadway star. The manager of the Gate, Hilton Edwards, later said he had not believed him but was impressed by his brashness and an impassioned audition he gave. Welles made his stage debut at the Gate Theatre on October 13, 1931, appearing in Ashley Dukes's adaptation of Jud Süß as Duke Karl Alexander of Württemberg. He performed small supporting roles in subsequent Gate productions, and he produced and designed productions of his own in Dublin. In March 1932, Welles performed in W. Somerset Maugham's The Circle at Dublin's Abbey Theatre and traveled to London to find additional work in the theatre. Unable to obtain a work permit, he returned to the U.S.

Welles found his fame ephemeral and turned to a writing project at Todd School that became immensely successful, first entitled Everybody's Shakespeare and subsequently, The Mercury Shakespeare. Welles traveled to North Africa while working on thousands of illustrations for the Everybody's Shakespeare series of educational books, a series that remained in print for decades.

In 1933, Roger and Hortense Hill invited Welles to a party in Chicago, where Welles met Thornton Wilder. Wilder arranged for Welles to meet Alexander Woollcott in New York in order that he be introduced to Katharine Cornell, who was assembling a repertory theatre company. Cornell's husband, director Guthrie McClintic, immediately put Welles under contract and cast him in three plays. Romeo and Juliet, The Barretts of Wimpole Street and Candida toured in repertory for 36 weeks beginning in November 1933, with the first of more than 200 performances taking place in Buffalo, New York.

In 1934, Welles got his first job on radio—with The American School of the Air—through actor-director Paul Stewart, who introduced him to director Knowles Entrikin. That summer, Welles staged a drama festival with the Todd School at the Opera House in Woodstock, Illinois, inviting Micheál Mac Liammóir and Hilton Edwards from Dublin's Gate Theatre to appear along with New York stage luminaries in productions including Trilby, Hamlet, The Drunkard and Tsar Paul. At the old firehouse in Woodstock, he also shot his first film, an eight-minute short titled, The Hearts of Age.

On November 14, 1934, Welles married Chicago socialite and actress Virginia Nicolson (often misspelled "Nicholson") in a civil ceremony in New York. To appease the Nicolsons, who were furious at the couple's elopement, a formal ceremony took place December 23, 1934, at the New Jersey mansion of the bride's godmother. Welles wore a cutaway borrowed from his friend George Macready.

A revised production of Katharine Cornell's Romeo and Juliet opened December 20, 1934, at the Martin Beck Theatre in New York. The Broadway production brought the 19-year-old Welles (now playing Tybalt) to the notice of John Houseman, a theatrical producer who was casting the lead role in the debut production of one of Archibald MacLeish's verse plays, Panic. On March 22, 1935, Welles made his debut on the CBS Radio series The March of Time, performing a scene from Panic for a news report on the stage production

By 1935, Welles was supplementing his earnings in the theatre as a radio actor in Manhattan, working with many actors who later formed the core of his Mercury Theatre on programs including America's Hour, Cavalcade of America, Columbia Workshop and The March of Time. "Within a year of his debut Welles could claim membership in that elite band of radio actors who commanded salaries second only to the highest paid movie stars," wrote critic Richard France.

Theatre (1936–1938)

Federal Theatre Project 

Part of the Works Progress Administration, the Federal Theatre Project (1935–39) was a New Deal program to fund theatre and other live artistic performances and entertainment programs in the United States during the Great Depression. It was created as a relief measure to employ artists, writers, directors and theatre workers. Under national director Hallie Flanagan it was shaped into a truly national theatre that created relevant art, encouraged experimentation and innovation, and made it possible for millions of Americans to see live theatre for the first time.

John Houseman, director of the Negro Theatre Unit in New York, invited Welles to join the Federal Theatre Project in 1935. Far from unemployed—"I was so employed I forgot how to sleep"—Welles put a large share of his $1,500-a-week radio earnings into his stage productions, bypassing administrative red tape and mounting the projects more quickly and professionally. "Roosevelt once said that I was the only operator in history who ever illegally siphoned money into a Washington project," Welles said.

The Federal Theatre Project was the ideal environment in which Welles could develop his art. Its purpose was employment, so he was able to hire any number of artists, craftsmen and technicians, and he filled the stage with performers. The company for the first production, an adaptation of William Shakespeare's Macbeth with an entirely African-American cast, numbered 150. The production became known as the Voodoo Macbeth because Welles changed the setting to a mythical island suggesting the Haitian court of King Henri Christophe, with Haitian vodou fulfilling the role of Scottish witchcraft. The play opened April 14, 1936, at the Lafayette Theatre in Harlem and was received rapturously. At 20, Welles was hailed as a prodigy. The production then made a 4,000-mile national tour that included two weeks at the Texas Centennial Exposition in Dallas.

Next mounted was the farce Horse Eats Hat, an adaptation by Welles and Edwin Denby of The Italian Straw Hat, an 1851 five-act farce by Eugène Marin Labiche and Marc-Michel. The play was presented September 26 – December 5, 1936, at Maxine Elliott's Theatre, New York, and featured Joseph Cotten in his first starring role. It was followed by an adaptation of Dr. Faustus that used light as a prime unifying scenic element in a nearly black stage, presented January 8 – May 9, 1937, at Maxine Elliott's Theatre.

Outside the scope of the Federal Theatre Project, American composer Aaron Copland chose Welles to direct The Second Hurricane (1937), an operetta with a libretto by Edwin Denby. Presented at the Henry Street Settlement Music School in New York for the benefit of high school students, the production opened April 21, 1937, and ran its scheduled three performances.

In 1937, Welles rehearsed Marc Blitzstein's political operetta, The Cradle Will Rock. It was originally scheduled to open June 16, 1937, in its first public preview. Because of severe federal cutbacks in the Works Progress projects, the show's premiere at the Maxine Elliott Theatre was canceled. The theater was locked and guarded to prevent any government-purchased materials from being used for a commercial production of the work. In a last-minute move, Welles announced to waiting ticket-holders that the show was being transferred to the Venice, 20 blocks away. Some cast, and some crew and audience, walked the distance on foot. The union musicians refused to perform in a commercial theater for lower non-union government wages. The actors' union stated that the production belonged to the Federal Theatre Project and could not be performed outside that context without permission. Lacking the participation of the union members, The Cradle Will Rock began with Blitzstein introducing the show and playing the piano accompaniment on stage with some cast members performing from the audience. This impromptu performance was well received by its audience.

Mercury Theatre 

Breaking with the Federal Theatre Project in 1937, Welles and Houseman founded their own repertory company, which they called the Mercury Theatre. The name was inspired by the title of the iconoclastic magazine The American Mercury. Welles was executive producer, and the original company included such actors as Joseph Cotten, George Coulouris, Geraldine Fitzgerald, Arlene Francis, Martin Gabel, John Hoyt, Norman Lloyd, Vincent Price, Stefan Schnabel and Hiram Sherman.

"I think he was the greatest directorial talent we've ever had in the [American] theater," Lloyd said of Welles in a 2014 interview. "When you saw a Welles production, you saw the text had been affected, the staging was remarkable, the sets were unusual, music, sound, lighting, a totality of everything. We had not had such a man in our theater. He was the first and remains the greatest."

The Mercury Theatre opened November 11, 1937, with Caesar, Welles's modern-dress adaptation of Shakespeare's tragedy Julius Caesar—streamlined into an anti-fascist tour de force that Joseph Cotten later described as "so vigorous, so contemporary that it set Broadway on its ear." The set was completely open with no curtain, and the brick stage wall was painted dark red. Scene changes were achieved by lighting alone. On the stage was a series of risers; squares were cut into one at intervals and lights were set beneath it, pointing straight up to evoke the "cathedral of light" at the Nuremberg Rallies. "He staged it like a political melodrama that happened the night before," said Lloyd.

Beginning January 1, 1938, Caesar was performed in repertory with The Shoemaker's Holiday; both productions moved to the larger National Theatre. They were followed by Heartbreak House (April 29, 1938) and Danton's Death (November 5, 1938). As well as being presented in a pared-down oratorio version at the Mercury Theatre on Sunday nights in December 1937, The Cradle Will Rock was at the Windsor Theatre for 13 weeks (January 4 – April 2, 1938). Such was the success of the Mercury Theatre that Welles appeared on the cover of Time magazine, in full makeup as Captain Shotover in Heartbreak House, in the issue dated May 9, 1938—three days after his 23rd birthday.

On April 6, 1938, during a production of Caesar, Orson Welles accidentally stabbed Joseph Holland with a steel knife during Act 3 Scene 1 where Brutus betrays Caesar, a real knife being used for the way it dramatically caught light during the scene. Holland took a month to recover from the injury, and this incident permanently damaged relations between the two.

Radio (1936–1940) 

Simultaneously with his work in the theatre, Welles worked extensively in radio as an actor, writer, director and producer, often without credit. Between 1935 and 1937 he was earning as much as $2,000 a week, shuttling between radio studios at such a pace that he would arrive barely in time for a quick scan of his lines before he was on the air. While he was directing the Voodoo Macbeth Welles was dashing between Harlem and midtown Manhattan three times a day to meet his radio commitments.

In addition to continuing as a repertory player on The March of Time, in the fall of 1936 Welles adapted and performed Hamlet in an early two-part episode of CBS Radio's Columbia Workshop. His performance as the announcer in the series' April 1937 presentation of Archibald MacLeish's verse drama The Fall of the City was an important development in his radio career and made the 21-year-old Welles an overnight star.

In July 1937, the Mutual Network gave Welles a seven-week series to adapt Les Misérables. It was his first job as a writer-director for radio, the radio debut of the Mercury Theatre, and one of Welles's earliest and finest achievements. He invented the use of narration in radio.

"By making himself the center of the storytelling process, Welles fostered the impression of self-adulation that was to haunt his career to his dying day", wrote critic Andrew Sarris. "For the most part, however, Welles was singularly generous to the other members of his cast and inspired loyalty from them above and beyond the call of professionalism."

That September, Mutual chose Welles to play Lamont Cranston, also known as The Shadow. He performed the role anonymously through mid-September 1938.

The Mercury Theatre on the Air 

After the theatrical successes of the Mercury Theatre, CBS Radio invited Orson Welles to create a summer show for 13 weeks. The series began July 11, 1938, initially titled First Person Singular, with the formula that Welles would play the lead in each show. Some months later the show was called The Mercury Theatre on the Air. The weekly hour-long show presented radio plays based on classic literary works, with original music composed and conducted by Bernard Herrmann.

The Mercury Theatre's radio adaptation of The War of the Worlds by H. G. Wells October 30, 1938, brought Welles instant fame. The combination of the news bulletin form of the performance with the between-breaks dial spinning habits of listeners was later reported to have created widespread confusion among listeners who failed to hear the introduction, although the extent of this confusion has come into question. Panic was reportedly spread among listeners who believed the fictional news reports of a Martian invasion. The myth of the result created by the combination was reported as fact around the world and disparagingly mentioned by Adolf Hitler in a public speech.

Welles's growing fame drew Hollywood offers, lures that the independent-minded Welles resisted at first. The Mercury Theatre on the Air, which had been a sustaining show (without sponsorship) was picked up by Campbell Soup and renamed The Campbell Playhouse. The Mercury Theatre on the Air made its last broadcast on December 4, 1938, and The Campbell Playhouse began five days later.

Welles began commuting from California to New York for the two Sunday broadcasts of The Campbell Playhouse after signing a film contract with RKO Pictures in August 1939. In November 1939, production of the show moved from New York to Los Angeles.

After 20 shows, Campbell began to exercise more creative control and had complete control over story selection. As his contract with Campbell came to an end, Welles chose not to sign on for another season. After the broadcast of March 31, 1940, Welles and Campbell parted amicably.

Hollywood (1939–1948) 

RKO Radio Pictures president George Schaefer eventually offered Welles what generally is considered the greatest contract offered to a filmmaker, much less to one who was untried. Engaging him to write, produce, direct and perform in two motion pictures, the contract subordinated the studio's financial interests to Welles's creative control, and broke all precedent by granting Welles the right of final cut. After signing a summary agreement with RKO on July 22, Welles signed a full-length 63-page contract August 21, 1939. The agreement was bitterly resented by the Hollywood studios and persistently mocked in the trade press.

Citizen Kane 

RKO rejected Welles's first two movie proposals, but agreed on the third offer—Citizen Kane. Welles co-wrote, produced and directed the film, and he performed the lead role. Welles conceived the project with screenwriter Herman J. Mankiewicz, who was writing radio plays for The Campbell Playhouse. Mankiewicz based the original outline of the film script on the life of William Randolph Hearst, whom he knew socially and came to hate after being exiled from Hearst's circle.

After agreeing on the storyline and character, Welles supplied Mankiewicz with 300 pages of notes and put him under contract to write the first draft screenplay under the supervision of John Houseman. Welles wrote his own draft, then drastically condensed and rearranged both versions and added scenes of his own. The industry accused Welles of underplaying Mankiewicz's contribution to the script, but Welles countered the attacks by saying, "At the end, naturally, I was the one making the picture, after all—who had to make the decisions. I used what I wanted of Mank's and, rightly or wrongly, kept what I liked of my own."

Welles's project attracted some of Hollywood's best technicians, including cinematographer Gregg Toland. For the cast, Welles primarily used actors from his Mercury Theatre. Filming Citizen Kane took ten weeks. Welles called Toland "the greatest gift any director—young or old—could ever, ever have. And he never tried to impress on us that he was performing miracles. He just went ahead and performed them. I was calling on him to do things only a beginner could be ignorant enough to think anybody could ever do, and there he was, doing them."

The film was scored by Bernard Herrmann, who had worked with Welles in radio. Welles said he worked with Hermann on the score "very intimately."

Hearst's newspapers barred all reference to Citizen Kane and exerted enormous pressure on the Hollywood film community to force RKO to shelve the film. RKO chief George Schaefer received a cash offer from MGM's Louis B. Mayer and other major studio executives if he would destroy the negative and existing prints of the film.

While waiting for Citizen Kane to be released, Welles produced and directed the original Broadway production of Native Son, a drama written by Paul Green and Richard Wright based on Wright's novel. Starring Canada Lee, the show ran March 24 – June 28, 1941, at the St. James Theatre. The Mercury Production was the last time Welles and Houseman worked together.

Citizen Kane was given a limited release and the film received overwhelming critical praise. It was voted the best picture of 1941 by the National Board of Review and the New York Film Critics Circle. The film garnered nine Academy Award nominations but won only for Best Original Screenplay, shared by Mankiewicz and Welles. Variety reported that block voting by screen extras deprived Citizen Kane of Oscars for Best Picture and Best Actor (Welles), and similar prejudices were likely to have been responsible for the film receiving no technical awards.

The delay in the film's release and uneven distribution contributed to mediocre results at the box office. After it ran its course theatrically, Citizen Kane was retired to the vault in 1942. In postwar France, however, the film's reputation grew after it was seen for the first time in 1946. In the United States, it began to be re-evaluated after it began to appear on television in 1956. That year it was also re-released theatrically, and film critic Andrew Sarris described it as "the great American film" and "the work that influenced the cinema more profoundly than any American film since The Birth of a Nation." Citizen Kane is now widely hailed as one of the greatest films ever made.

The Magnificent Ambersons 

Welles's second film for RKO was The Magnificent Ambersons, adapted by Welles from the Pulitzer Prize-winning novel by Booth Tarkington. Toland was not available, so Stanley Cortez was named cinematographer. The meticulous Cortez worked slowly and the film lagged behind schedule and over budget. Prior to production, Welles's contract was renegotiated, revoking his right to control the final cut. The Magnificent Ambersons was in production October 28, 1941 – January 22, 1942. Much of the cast of Kane returned, including Joseph Cotten, Agnes Moorehead, and Ray Collins. It also features Anne Baxter as Lucy Morgan, Dolores Costello as Isabel Anderson Minafer, Tim Holt as George Amberson Minafer and Richard Bennett as Major Amberson. RKO cut more than forty minutes of footage and added a happy ending, against Welles's wishes. Bernard Herrmann wrote some of the score but demanded his name be removed from the credits after the film was edited. The film that survives is still considered a classic. Molly Haskell writes: "Orson Welles so deftly manages rhythm and tone—a complex blend of irony and empathy—and the intertwining of aural and visual effects that, even as its time rolls relentlessly on and bitter memories accumulate, we constantly feel the exhilaration of virtuoso storytelling. Though less flashy than Citizen Kane, Welles's astonishing debut of the year before, Ambersons cuts deeper, and without the magnetizing hulk of Welles at its center, it's more genuinely polyphoinc." François Truffaut asked, "if Flaubert reread Quixote every year, why can't we see Ambersons whenever possible?"

As an inside joke, Welles included a shot of a newspaper called the Indianapolis Daily Inquirer with a column titled "Stage Views" by Jed Leland. The Inquirer was one of Kane's papers, and Jed Leland (Joseph Cotten) was its theater critic.

Throughout the shooting of the film Welles was also producing a weekly half-hour radio series, The Orson Welles Show. Many of the Ambersons cast participated in the CBS Radio series, which ran from September 15, 1941, to February 2, 1942.

Peter Bogdanovich recalled watching the film on television with Welles, who had tears in his eyes. Bogdanovich "asked Orson about that evening. I said I supposed it had been painful for him to watch the movie in its butchered form. 'No,' he said. It's wasn't that—not that at all. That just makes me angry. Don't you see? It was because it's the past—it's over...'" Nostalgia is a theme of many of Welles's films, including Ambersons.

Journey into Fear 

At RKO's request, Welles worked on an adaptation of Eric Ambler's spy thriller Journey into Fear, co-written with Joseph Cotten. In addition to acting in the film, Welles was the producer. Direction was credited to Norman Foster. Welles later said that they were in such a rush that the director of each scene was determined by whoever was closest to the camera.

Journey into Fear was in production January 6 – March 12, 1942.

War work

Goodwill ambassador 

In late November 1941, Welles was appointed as a goodwill ambassador to Latin America by Nelson Rockefeller, U.S. Coordinator of Inter-American Affairs and a principal stockholder in RKO Radio Pictures. The mission of the OCIAA was cultural diplomacy, promoting hemispheric solidarity and countering the growing influence of the Axis powers in Latin America. John Hay Whitney, head of the agency's Motion Picture Division, was asked by the Brazilian government to produce a documentary of the annual Rio Carnival celebration taking place in early February 1942. In a telegram on December 20, 1941, Whitney wrote Welles, "Personally believe you would make great contribution to hemisphere solidarity with this project."

The OCIAA sponsored cultural tours to Latin America and appointed goodwill ambassadors including George Balanchine and the American Ballet, Bing Crosby, Aaron Copland, Walt Disney, John Ford and Rita Hayworth. Welles was thoroughly briefed in Washington, D.C., immediately before his departure for Brazil, and film scholar Catherine L. Benamou, a specialist in Latin American affairs, finds it "not unlikely" that he was among the goodwill ambassadors who were asked to gather intelligence for the U.S. government in addition to their cultural duties. She concludes that Welles's acceptance of Whitney's request was "a logical and patently patriotic choice".

In addition to working on his ill-fated film project It's All True, Welles was responsible for radio programs, lectures, interviews and informal talks as part of his OCIAA-sponsored cultural mission, which was regarded as a success. He spoke on topics ranging from Shakespeare to visual art at gatherings of Brazil's elite, and his two intercontinental radio broadcasts in April 1942 were particularly intended to tell U.S. audiences that President Vargas was a partner with the Allies. Welles's ambassadorial mission was extended to permit his travel to other nations including Argentina, Bolivia, Chile, Colombia, Ecuador, Guatemala, Mexico, Peru and Uruguay. Welles worked for more than half a year with no compensation.

Welles's own expectations for the film were modest. "It's All True was not going to make any cinematic history, nor was it intended to," he later said. "It was intended to be a perfectly honorable execution of my job as a goodwill ambassador, bringing entertainment to the Northern Hemisphere that showed them something about the Southern one."

It's All True 

In July 1941, Welles conceived It's All True as an omnibus film mixing documentary and docufiction in a project that emphasized the dignity of labor and celebrated the cultural and ethnic diversity of North America. It was to have been his third film for RKO, following Citizen Kane (1941) and The Magnificent Ambersons (1942). Duke Ellington was put under contract to score a segment with the working title, "The Story of Jazz", drawn from Louis Armstrong's 1936 autobiography, Swing That Music. Armstrong was cast to play himself in the brief dramatization of the history of jazz performance, from its roots to its place in American culture in the 1940s. "The Story of Jazz" was to go into production in December 1941.

Mercury Productions purchased the stories for two other segments—"My Friend Bonito" and "The Captain's Chair"—from documentary filmmaker Robert J. Flaherty. Adapted by Norman Foster and John Fante, "My Friend Bonito" was the only segment of the original It's All True to go into production. Filming took place in Mexico September–December 1941, with Norman Foster directing under Welles's supervision.

In December 1941, the Office of the Coordinator of Inter-American Affairs asked Welles to make a film in Brazil that would showcase the Carnaval in Rio de Janeiro. With filming of "My Friend Bonito" about two-thirds complete, Welles decided he could shift the geography of It's All True and incorporate Flaherty's story into an omnibus film about Latin America—supporting the Roosevelt administration's Good Neighbor policy, which Welles strongly advocated. In this revised concept, "The Story of Jazz" was replaced by the story of samba, a musical form with a comparable history and one that came to fascinate Welles. He also decided to do a ripped-from-the-headlines episode about the epic voyage of four poor Brazilian fishermen, the jangadeiros, who had become national heroes. Welles later said this was the most valuable story.

Required to film the Carnaval in Rio de Janeiro in early February 1942, Welles rushed to edit The Magnificent Ambersons and finish his acting scenes in Journey into Fear. He ended his lucrative CBS radio show February 2, flew to Washington, D.C., for a briefing, and then lashed together a rough cut of Ambersons in Miami with editor Robert Wise. Welles recorded the film's narration the night before he left for South America: "I went to the projection room at about four in the morning, did the whole thing, and then got on the plane and off to Rio—and the end of civilization as we know it."

Welles left for Brazil on February 4 and began filming in Rio on February 8, 1942. At the time it did not seem that Welles's other film projects would be disrupted, but as film historian Catherine L. Benamou wrote, "the ambassadorial appointment would be the first in a series of turning points leading—in 'zigs' and 'zags,' rather than in a straight line—to Welles's loss of complete directorial control over both The Magnificent Ambersons and It's All True, the cancellation of his contract at RKO Radio Studio, the expulsion of his company Mercury Productions from the RKO lot, and, ultimately, the total suspension of It's All True.

In 1942 RKO Pictures underwent major changes under new management. Nelson Rockefeller, the primary backer of the Brazil project, left its board of directors, and Welles's principal sponsor at RKO, studio president George Schaefer, resigned. RKO took control of Ambersons and edited the film into what the studio considered a commercial format. Welles's attempts to protect his version ultimately failed. In South America, Welles requested resources to finish It's All True. Given a limited amount of black-and-white film stock and a silent camera, he was able to finish shooting the episode about the jangadeiros, but RKO refused to support further production on the film.

"So I was fired from RKO," Welles later recalled. "And they made a great publicity point of the fact that I had gone to South America without a script and thrown all this money away. I never recovered from that attack." Later in 1942, when RKO Pictures began promoting its new corporate motto, "Showmanship In Place of Genius: A New Deal at RKO", Welles understood it as a reference to him.

Radio (1942–1943) 

Welles returned to the United States August 22, 1942, after more than six months in South America. A week after his return he produced and emceed the first two hours of a seven-hour coast-to-coast War Bond drive broadcast titled I Pledge America. Airing August 29, 1942, on the Blue Network, the program was presented in cooperation with the United States Department of the Treasury, Western Union (which wired bond subscriptions free of charge) and the American Women's Voluntary Services. Featuring 21 dance bands and a score of stage and screen and radio stars, the broadcast raised more than $10 million—more than $146 million today—for the war effort.

On October 12, 1942, Cavalcade of America presented Welles's radio play, Admiral of the Ocean Sea, an entertaining and factual look at the legend of Christopher Columbus.

"It belongs to a period when hemispheric unity was a crucial matter and many programs were being devoted to the common heritage of the Americas," wrote broadcasting historian Erik Barnouw. "Many such programs were being translated into Spanish and Portuguese and broadcast to Latin America, to counteract many years of successful Axis propaganda to that area. The Axis, trying to stir Latin America against Anglo-America, had constantly emphasized the differences between the two. It became the job of American radio to emphasize their common experience and essential unity."

Admiral of the Ocean Sea, also known as Columbus Day, begins with the words, "Hello Americans"—the title Welles would choose for his own series five weeks later.

Hello Americans, a CBS Radio series broadcast November 15, 1942 – January 31, 1943, was produced, directed and hosted by Welles under the auspices of the Office of the Coordinator for Inter-American Affairs. The 30-minute weekly program promoted inter-American understanding and friendship, drawing upon the research amassed for the ill-fated film, It's All True. The series was produced concurrently with Welles's other CBS series, Ceiling Unlimited (November 9, 1942 – February 1, 1943), sponsored by the Lockheed-Vega Corporation. The program was conceived to glorify the aviation industry and dramatize its role in World War II. Welles's shows were regarded as significant contributions to the war effort.

Throughout the war Welles worked on patriotic radio programs including Command Performance, G.I. Journal, Mail Call, Nazi Eyes on Canada, Stage Door Canteen and Treasury Star Parade.

The Mercury Wonder Show 

In early 1943, the two concurrent radio series (Ceiling Unlimited, Hello Americans) that Orson Welles created for CBS to support the war effort had ended. Filming also had wrapped on the 1943 film adaptation of Jane Eyre and that fee, in addition to the income from his regular guest-star roles in radio, made it possible for Welles to fulfill a lifelong dream. He approached the War Assistance League of Southern California and proposed a show that evolved into a big-top spectacle, part circus and part magic show. He offered his services as magician and director, and invested some $40,000 of his own money in an extravaganza he co-produced with his friend Joseph Cotten: The Mercury Wonder Show for Service Men. Members of the U.S. armed forces were admitted free of charge, while the general public had to pay. The show entertained more than 1,000 service members each night, and proceeds went to the War Assistance League, a charity for military service personnel.

The development of the show coincided with the resolution of Welles's oft-changing draft status in May 1943, when he was finally declared 4-F—unfit for military service—for a variety of medical reasons. "I felt guilty about the war," Welles told biographer Barbara Leaming. "I was guilt-ridden about my civilian status." He had been publicly hounded about his patriotism since Citizen Kane, when the Hearst press began persistent inquiries about why Welles had not been drafted.

The Mercury Wonder Show ran August 3 – September 9, 1943, in an 80-by-120-foot tent located at 900 Cahuenga Boulevard, in the heart of Hollywood.

At intermission on September 7, 1943, KMPC radio interviewed audience and cast members of The Mercury Wonder Show—including Welles and Rita Hayworth, who were married earlier that day. Welles remarked that The Mercury Wonder Show had been performed for approximately 48,000 members of the U.S. armed forces.

Radio (1944–1945) 

The idea of doing a radio variety show occurred to Welles after his success as substitute host of four consecutive episodes (March 14 – April 4, 1943) of The Jack Benny Program, radio's most popular show, when Benny contracted pneumonia on a performance tour of military bases. A half-hour variety show broadcast January 26 – July 19, 1944, on the Columbia Pacific Network, The Orson Welles Almanac presented sketch comedy, magic, mindreading, music and readings from classic works. Many of the shows originated on U.S. military camps, where Welles and his repertory company and guests entertained the troops with a reduced version of The Mercury Wonder Show. The performances of the all-star jazz group Welles brought together for the show were so popular that the band became a regular feature and was an important force in reviving interest in traditional New Orleans jazz.
Welles was placed on the U.S. Treasury payroll on May 15, 1944, as an expert consultant for the duration of the war, with a retainer of $1 a year. On the recommendation of President Franklin D. Roosevelt, Secretary of the Treasury Henry Morgenthau asked Welles to lead the Fifth War Loan Drive, which opened June 12 with a one-hour radio show on all four networks, broadcast from Texarkana, Texas. Including a statement by the President, the program defined the causes of the war and encouraged Americans to buy $16 billion in bonds to finance the Normandy landings and the most violent phase of World War II. Welles produced additional war loan drive broadcasts on June 14 from the Hollywood Bowl, and June 16 from Soldier Field, Chicago. Americans purchased $20.6 billion in War Bonds during the Fifth War Loan Drive, which ended on July 8, 1944.

Welles campaigned ardently for Roosevelt in 1944. A long-time supporter and campaign speaker for FDR, he occasionally sent the president ideas and phrases that were sometimes incorporated into what Welles characterized as "less important speeches". One of these ideas was the joke in what came to be called the Fala speech, Roosevelt's nationally broadcast September 23 address to the International Teamsters Union which opened the 1944 presidential campaign.

Welles campaigned for the Roosevelt–Truman ticket almost full-time in the fall of 1944, traveling to nearly every state to the detriment of his own health and at his own expense. In addition to his radio addresses he filled in for Roosevelt, opposite Republican presidential nominee Thomas E. Dewey, at The New York Herald Tribune Forum broadcast October 18 on the Blue Network. Welles accompanied FDR to his last campaign rally, speaking at an event November 4 at Boston's Fenway Park before 40,000 people, and took part in a historic election-eve campaign broadcast November 6 on all four radio networks.

On November 21, 1944, Welles began his association with This Is My Best, a CBS radio series he would briefly produce, direct, write and host (March 13 – April 24, 1945). He wrote a political column called Orson Welles' Almanac (later titled Orson Welles Today) for The New York Post January–November 1945, and advocated the continuation of FDR's New Deal policies and his international vision, particularly the establishment of the United Nations and the cause of world peace.

On April 12, 1945, the day Franklin D. Roosevelt died, the Blue-ABC network marshalled its entire executive staff and national leaders to pay homage to the late president. "Among the outstanding programs which attracted wide attention was a special tribute delivered by Orson Welles", reported Broadcasting magazine. Welles spoke at 10:10 p.m Eastern War Time, from Hollywood, and stressed the importance of continuing FDR's work: "He has no need for homage and we who loved him have no time for tears ... Our fighting sons and brothers cannot pause tonight to mark the death of him whose name will be given to the age we live in."

Welles presented another special broadcast on the death of Roosevelt the following evening: "We must move on beyond mere death to that free world which was the hope and labor of his life."

He dedicated the April 17 episode of This Is My Best to Roosevelt and the future of America on the eve of the United Nations Conference on International Organization. Welles was an advisor and correspondent for the Blue-ABC radio network's coverage of the San Francisco conference that formed the UN, taking place April 24 – June 23, 1945. He presented a half-hour dramatic program written by Ben Hecht on the opening day of the conference, and on Sunday afternoons (April 29 – June 10) he led a weekly discussion from the San Francisco Civic Auditorium.

The Stranger 

In the fall of 1945 Welles began work on The Stranger (1946), a film noir drama about a war crimes investigator who tracks a high-ranking Nazi fugitive to an idyllic New England town. Edward G. Robinson, Loretta Young and Welles star.

Producer Sam Spiegel initially planned to hire director John Huston, who had rewritten the screenplay by Anthony Veiller. When Huston entered the military, Welles was given the chance to direct and prove himself able to make a film on schedule and under budget—something he was so eager to do that he accepted a disadvantageous contract. One of its concessions was that he would defer to the studio in any creative dispute.

The Stranger was Welles's first job as a film director in four years. He was told that if the film was successful he could sign a four-picture deal with International Pictures, making films of his own choosing. Welles was given some degree of creative control, and he endeavored to personalize the film and develop a nightmarish tone. He worked on the general rewrite of the script and wrote scenes at the beginning of the picture that were shot but subsequently cut by the producers. He filmed in long takes that largely thwarted the control given to editor Ernest J. Nims under the terms of the contract.

The Stranger was the first commercial film to use documentary footage from the Nazi concentration camps. Welles had seen the footage in early May 1945 in San Francisco, as a correspondent and discussion moderator at the UN Conference on International Organization. He wrote of the Holocaust footage in his syndicated New York Post column May 7, 1945.

Completed a day ahead of schedule and under budget, The Stranger was the only film made by Welles to have been a bona fide box office success upon its release. Its cost was $1.034 million; 15 months after its release it had grossed $3.216 million. Within weeks of the completion of the film, International Pictures backed out of its promised four-picture deal with Welles. No reason was given, but the impression was left that The Stranger would not make money.

Around the World 

In the summer of 1946, Welles moved to New York to direct the Broadway musical Around the World, a stage adaptation of Jules Verne's novel Around the World in Eighty Days with a book by Welles and music by Cole Porter. Producer Mike Todd, who would later produce the successful 1956 film adaptation, pulled out from the lavish and expensive production, leaving Welles to support the finances. When Welles ran out of money he convinced Columbia Pictures president Harry Cohn to send enough money to continue the show, and in exchange Welles promised to write, produce, direct and star in a film for Cohn for no further fee. The stage show soon failed due to poor box-office, with Welles unable to claim the losses on his taxes. Inspired by magician and cinema pioneer Georges Méliès, the show required fifty-five stagehands and used films to bridge scenes. Welles said it was his favorite of his stage productions. Regarding its extravagance, critic Robert Garland said it had "everything but the kitchen sink." The next night, Welles brought out a kitchen sink.

Radio (1946) 

In 1946, Welles began two new radio series—The Mercury Summer Theatre of the Air for CBS, and Orson Welles Commentaries for ABC. While Mercury Summer Theatre featured half-hour adaptations of some classic Mercury radio shows from the 1930s, the first episode was a condensation of his Around the World stage play, and is the only record of Cole Porter's music for the project. Several original Mercury actors returned for the series, as well as Bernard Herrmann. Welles invested his earnings into his failing stage play. Commentaries was a political vehicle for him, continuing the themes from his New York Post column. Again, Welles lacked a clear focus, until the NAACP brought to his attention the case of Isaac Woodard. Welles brought significant attention to Woodard's cause.

The last broadcast of Orson Welles Commentaries on October 6, 1946, marked the end of Welles's own radio shows.

The Lady from Shanghai 

The film that Welles was obliged to make in exchange for Harry Cohn's help in financing the stage production Around the World was The Lady from Shanghai, filmed in 1947 for Columbia Pictures. Intended as a modest thriller, the budget skyrocketed after Cohn suggested that Welles's then-estranged second wife Rita Hayworth co-star.

Cohn disliked Welles's rough cut, particularly the confusing plot and lack of close-ups, and was not in sympathy with Welles's Brechtian use of irony and black comedy, especially in a farcical courtroom scene. Cohn ordered extensive editing and re-shoots. After heavy editing by the studio, approximately one hour of Welles's first cut was removed, including much of a climactic confrontation scene in an amusement park funhouse. While expressing displeasure at the cuts, Welles was appalled particularly with the musical score. The film was considered a disaster in America at the time of release, though the closing shootout in a hall of mirrors (the use of mirrors being a recurrent motif of Welles's, starting with Kane) has since become a touchstone of film noir. Not long after release, Welles and Hayworth finalized their divorce.

Although The Lady from Shanghai was acclaimed in Europe, it was not embraced in the U.S. until decades later, where it is now often regarded as a classic of film noir. A similar difference in reception on opposite sides of the Atlantic, followed by greater American acceptance, befell the Welles-inspired Chaplin film Monsieur Verdoux, originally to be directed by Welles starring Chaplin, then directed by Chaplin with the idea credited to Welles.

Macbeth 

Prior to 1948, Welles convinced Republic Pictures to let him direct a low-budget version of Macbeth, which featured highly stylized sets and costumes, and a cast of actors lip-syncing to a pre-recorded soundtrack, one of many innovative cost-cutting techniques Welles deployed in an attempt to make an epic film from B-movie resources. The script, adapted by Welles, is a violent reworking of Shakespeare's original, freely cutting and pasting lines into new contexts via a collage technique and recasting Macbeth as a clash of pagan and proto-Christian ideologies. Some voodoo trappings of the famous Welles/Houseman Negro Theatre stage adaptation are visible, especially in the film's characterization of the Weird Sisters, who create an effigy of Macbeth as a charm to enchant him. Of all Welles's post-Kane Hollywood productions, Macbeth is stylistically closest to Citizen Kane in its long takes and deep focus photography.

Republic initially trumpeted the film as an important work but decided it did not care for the Scottish accents and held up general release for almost a year after early negative press reaction, including Lifes comment that Welles's film "doth foully slaughter Shakespeare." Welles left for Europe, while co-producer and lifelong supporter Richard Wilson reworked the soundtrack. Welles returned and cut 20 minutes from the film at Republic's request and recorded narration to cover some gaps. The film was decried as a disaster. Macbeth had influential fans in Europe, especially the French poet and filmmaker Jean Cocteau, who hailed the film's "crude, irreverent power" and careful shot design, and described the characters as haunting "the corridors of some dreamlike subway, an abandoned coal mine, and ruined cellars oozing with water."

Europe (1948–1956) 

In Italy he starred as Cagliostro in the 1948 film Black Magic. His co-star, Akim Tamiroff, impressed Welles so much that Tamiroff would appear in four of Welles's productions during the 1950s and 1960s.

The following year, Welles starred as Harry Lime in Carol Reed's The Third Man, alongside Joseph Cotten, his friend and co-star from Citizen Kane, with a script by Graham Greene and a memorable score by Anton Karas. In it, Welles makes what Roger Ebert called "the most famous entrance in the movies, and one of the most famous speeches." Greene credited the speech to Welles.

A few years later, British radio producer Harry Alan Towers would resurrect the Lime character in the radio series The Adventures of Harry Lime.

Welles appeared as Cesare Borgia in the 1949 Italian film Prince of Foxes, with Tyrone Power and Mercury Theatre alumnus Everett Sloane, and as the Mongol warrior Bayan in the 1950 film version of the novel The Black Rose (again with Tyrone Power).

Othello 

During this time, Welles was channeling his money from acting jobs into a self-financed film version of Shakespeare's play Othello. From 1949 to 1951, Welles worked on Othello, filming on location in Italy and Morocco. The film featured Welles's friends Micheál Mac Liammóir as Iago and Hilton Edwards as Desdemona's father Brabantio. Suzanne Cloutier starred as Desdemona and Campbell Playhouse alumnus Robert Coote appeared as Iago's associate Roderigo.

Filming was suspended several times as Welles ran out of funds and left for acting jobs, accounted in detail in MacLiammóir's published memoir Put Money in Thy Purse. The American release prints had a technically flawed soundtrack, suffering from a dropout of sound at every quiet moment. Welles's daughter, Beatrice Welles-Smith, restored Othello in 1992 for a wide re-release. The restoration included reconstructing Angelo Francesco Lavagnino's original musical score, which was originally inaudible, and adding ambient stereo sound effects, which were not in the original film. The restoration went on to a successful theatrical run in America. David Thomson writes of Welles's Othello, "the poetry hangs in the air, like sea mist or incense." Anthony Lane writes that "Some of the action was shot in Venice, and I occasionally wonder what crept into the camera casing; the movie looks blackened and silvery, like an aged mirror, or as if the emulsion of the print were already poised to decay. You can't tell what is or isn't Shakespeare, where his influence begins and ends." The movie premiered at the Cannes Film Festival, where it won the Grand Prix (precursor of the Palme d'or).

In 1952, Welles continued finding work in England after the success of the Harry Lime radio show. Harry Alan Towers offered Welles another series, The Black Museum, which ran for 52 weeks with Welles as host and narrator. Director Herbert Wilcox offered Welles the part of the murdered victim in Trent's Last Case, based on the novel by E. C. Bentley. In 1953, the BBC hired Welles to read an hour of selections from Walt Whitman's epic poem Song of Myself. Towers hired Welles again, to play Professor Moriarty in the radio seriesThe Adventures of Sherlock Holmes starring John Gielgud and Ralph Richardson.

Welles briefly returned to America to make his first appearance on television, starring in the Omnibus presentation of King Lear, broadcast live on CBS October 18, 1953. Directed by Peter Brook, the production costarred Natasha Parry, Beatrice Straight and Arnold Moss.

In 1954, director George More O'Ferrall offered Welles the title role in the 'Lord Mountdrago' segment of Three Cases of Murder, co-starring Alan Badel. Herbert Wilcox cast Welles as the antagonist in Trouble in the Glen opposite Margaret Lockwood, Forrest Tucker and Victor McLaglen. Old friend John Huston cast him as Father Mapple in his 1956 film adaptation of Herman Melville's Moby-Dick, starring Gregory Peck.

Mr. Arkadin 

Welles's next turn as director was the film Mr. Arkadin (1955), which was produced by his political mentor from the 1940s, Louis Dolivet. It was filmed in France, Germany, Spain and Italy on a very limited budget. Based loosely on several episodes of the Harry Lime radio show, it stars Welles as a billionaire who hires a man to delve into the secrets of his past. The film stars Robert Arden, who had worked on the Harry Lime series; Welles's third wife, Paola Mori, whose voice was dubbed by actress Billie Whitelaw; and guest stars Akim Tamiroff, Michael Redgrave, Katina Paxinou and Mischa Auer. Frustrated by his slow progress in the editing room, producer Dolivet removed Welles from the project and finished the film without him. Eventually, five different versions of the film would be released, two in Spanish and three in English. The version that Dolivet completed was retitled Confidential Report. In 2005 Stefan Droessler of the Munich Film Museum oversaw a reconstruction of the surviving film elements.

Television projects 

In 1955, Welles also directed two television series for the BBC. The first was Orson Welles' Sketch Book, a series of six 15-minute shows featuring Welles drawing in a sketchbook to illustrate his reminiscences for the camera (including such topics as the filming of It's All True and the Isaac Woodard case), and the second was Around the World with Orson Welles, a series of six travelogues set in different locations around Europe (such as Vienna, the Basque Country between France and Spain, and England). Welles served as host and interviewer, his commentary including documentary facts and his own personal observations (a technique he would continue to explore in later works).

During Episode 3 of Sketchbook, Welles makes a deliberate attack on the abuse of police powers around the world. The episode starts with him telling the story of Isaac Woodard, an African-American veteran of the South Pacific during World War II being falsely accused by a bus driver of being drunk and disorderly, who then has a policeman remove the man from the bus. Woodard is not arrested right away, but rather he is beaten into unconsciousness nearly to the point of death and when he finally regains consciousness he is permanently blinded. By the time doctors from the US Army located him three weeks later, there was nothing that could be done. Welles assures the audience that he personally saw to it that justice was served to this policeman although he doesn't mention what type of justice was delivered. Welles then goes on to give other examples of police being given more power and authority than is necessary. The title of this episode is "The Police".

In 1956, Welles completed Portrait of Gina. He left the only copy of it in his room at the Hôtel Ritz in Paris. The film cans would remain in a lost-and-found locker at the hotel for several decades, where they were discovered in 1986, after Welles's death.

Return to Hollywood (1956–1959) 

In 1956, Welles returned to Hollywood.

He began filming a projected pilot for Desilu, owned by Lucille Ball and her husband Desi Arnaz, who had recently purchased the former RKO studios. The film was The Fountain of Youth, based on a story by John Collier. Originally deemed not viable as a pilot, the film was not aired until 1958—and won the Peabody Award for excellence.

Welles guest starred on television shows including I Love Lucy. On radio, he was narrator of Tomorrow (October 17, 1956), a nuclear holocaust drama produced and syndicated by ABC and the Federal Civil Defense Administration.

Welles's next feature film role was in Man in the Shadow for Universal Pictures in 1957, starring Jeff Chandler.

Touch of Evil 

Welles stayed on at Universal to direct (and co-star with) Charlton Heston in the 1958 film Touch of Evil, based on Whit Masterson's novel Badge of Evil. Originally only hired as an actor, Welles was promoted to director by Universal Studios at the insistence of Heston. The film reunited many actors and technicians with whom Welles had worked in Hollywood in the 1940s, including cameraman Russell Metty (The Stranger), makeup artist Maurice Seiderman (Citizen Kane), and actors Joseph Cotten, Marlene Dietrich and Akim Tamiroff. Filming proceeded smoothly, with Welles finishing on schedule and on budget, and the studio bosses praising the daily rushes. Nevertheless, after the end of production, the studio re-edited the film, re-shot scenes, and shot new exposition scenes to clarify the plot. Welles wrote a 58-page memo outlining suggestions and objections, stating that the film was no longer his version—it was the studio's, but as such, he was still prepared to help with it. The movie was shown at the 1958 Brussels World's Fair, where it won the grand prize. François Truffaut saw the film in Brussels, and it influenced his debut The 400 Blows, one of the seminal films of the French New Wave.

In 1978, a longer preview version of the film was discovered and released. In 1998, Walter Murch reedited the film according to Welles's specifications in his memo. Murch said  "I’m just flabbergasted when I read his memos, thinking that he was writing these ideas forty years ago, because, if I was working on a film now and a director came up with ideas like these, I’d be amazed – pleased but amazed – to realize that someone was thinking that hard about sound – which is all too rare." The film was influential in its use of a handheld camera, notably in the scene in the elevator. Murch says that "I'm sure Godard and Truffaut, who were big fans of Touch of Evil, learned from that scene how they could achieve exactly what they wanted—at once both a fresh sense of reality and ingenuity." 

As Universal reworked Touch of Evil, Welles began filming his adaptation of Miguel de Cervantes's novel Don Quixote in Mexico, starring Mischa Auer as Quixote and Akim Tamiroff as Sancho Panza.

Return to Europe (1959–1970) 

He continued shooting Don Quixote in Spain and Italy, but replaced Mischa Auer with Francisco Reiguera, and resumed acting jobs.
In Italy in 1959, Welles directed his own scenes as King Saul in Richard Pottier's film David and Goliath. In Hong Kong, he co-starred with Curt Jürgens in Lewis Gilbert's film Ferry to Hong Kong. In 1960, in Paris he co-starred in Richard Fleischer's film Crack in the Mirror. In Yugoslavia he starred in Richard Thorpe's film The Tartars and Veljko Bulajić's Battle of Neretva.

Throughout the 1960s, filming continued on Quixote on-and-off until the end of the decade, as Welles evolved the concept, tone and ending several times. Although he had a complete version of the film shot and edited at least once, he would continue toying with the editing well into the 1980s, he never completed a version of the film he was fully satisfied with and would junk existing footage and shoot new footage. (In one case, he had a complete cut ready in which Quixote and Sancho Panza end up going to the moon, but he felt the ending was rendered obsolete by the 1969 moon landings and burned 10 reels of this version.) As the process went on, Welles gradually voiced all of the characters himself and provided narration. In 1992, the director Jesús Franco constructed a film out of the portions of Quixote left behind by Welles. Some of the film stock had decayed badly. While the Welles footage was greeted with interest, the post-production by Franco was met with harsh criticism.

In 1961, Welles directed In the Land of Don Quixote, a series of eight half-hour episodes for the Italian television network RAI. Similar to the Around the World with Orson Welles series, they presented travelogues of Spain and included Welles's wife, Paola, and their daughter, Beatrice. Though Welles was fluent in Italian, the network was not interested in him providing Italian narration because of his accent, and the series sat unreleased until 1964, by which time the network had added Italian narration of its own. Ultimately, versions of the episodes were released with the original musical score Welles had approved, but without the narration.

The Trial 

In 1962, Welles directed his adaptation of The Trial, based on the novel by Franz Kafka and produced by Michael and Alexander Salkind. The cast included Anthony Perkins as Josef K, Jeanne Moreau, Romy Schneider, Paola Mori and Akim Tamiroff. While filming exteriors in Zagreb, Welles was informed that the Salkinds had run out of money, meaning that there could be no set construction. No stranger to shooting on found locations, Welles soon filmed the interiors in the Gare d'Orsay, at that time an abandoned railway station in Paris. Welles thought the location possessed a "Jules Verne modernism" and a melancholy sense of "waiting", both suitable for Kafka. To remain in the spirit of Kafka, Welles set up the cutting room together with the Film Editor, Frederick Muller (as Fritz Muller), in the old unused, cold, depressing, station master office. The film failed at the box-office. Peter Bogdanovich would later observe that Welles found the film riotously funny. Welles also told a BBC interviewer that it was his best film. While filming The Trial Welles met Oja Kodar, who later became his partner and collaborator for the last 20 years of his life.

Welles played a film director in La Ricotta (1963), Pier Paolo Pasolini's segment of the Ro.Go.Pa.G. movie, although his renowned voice was dubbed by Italian writer Giorgio Bassani. He continued taking what work he could find acting, narrating or hosting other people's work, and began filming Chimes at Midnight, which was completed in 1965.

Chimes at Midnight 

Filmed in Spain, Chimes at Midnight was based on Welles's play, Five Kings, in which he drew material from six Shakespeare plays to tell the story of Sir John Falstaff (Welles) and his relationship with Prince Hal (Keith Baxter). The cast includes John Gielgud, Jeanne Moreau, Fernando Rey and Margaret Rutherford; the film's narration, spoken by Ralph Richardson, is taken from the chronicler Raphael Holinshed. Welles held the film in high regard: "It's my favorite picture, yes. If I wanted to get into heaven on the basis of one movie, that's the one I would offer up." Anthony Lane writes that "what Welles means to conjure up is not just historical continuity—the very best of Sir John—but a sense that the Complete Works of Shakespeare constitute, as it were, one vast poem, from which his devoted and audacious interpreters are free to quote... the picture both honors Shakespeare and spurns the industry, academic and theatrical, that has encrusted him over time."

In 1966, Welles directed a film for French television, an adaptation of The Immortal Story, by Karen Blixen. Released in 1968, it stars Jeanne Moreau, Roger Coggio and Norman Eshley. The film had a successful run in French theaters. At this time Welles met Oja Kodar again, and gave her a letter he had written to her and had been keeping for four years; they would not be parted again. They immediately began a collaboration both personal and professional. The first of these was an adaptation of Blixen's The Heroine, meant to be a companion piece to The Immortal Story and starring Kodar. Unfortunately, funding disappeared after one day's shooting. After completing this film, he appeared in a brief cameo as Cardinal Wolsey in Fred Zinnemann's adaptation of A Man for All Seasons—a role for which he won considerable acclaim.

In 1967, Welles began directing The Deep, based on the novel Dead Calm by Charles Williams and filmed off the shore of Yugoslavia. The cast included Jeanne Moreau, Laurence Harvey and Kodar. Personally financed by Welles and Kodar, they could not obtain the funds to complete the project, and it was abandoned a few years later after the death of Harvey. The surviving footage was eventually edited and released by the Filmmuseum München. In 1968 Welles began filming a TV special for CBS under the title Orson's Bag, combining travelogue, comedy skits and a condensation of Shakespeare's play The Merchant of Venice with Welles as Shylock. In 1969 Welles called again the Film Editor Frederick Muller to work with him re-editing the material and they set up cutting rooms at the Safa Palatino Studios in Rome. Funding for the show sent by CBS to Welles in Switzerland was seized by the IRS. Without funding, the show was not completed. The surviving film clips portions were eventually released by the Filmmuseum München.

In 1969, Welles authorized the use of his name for a cinema in Cambridge, Massachusetts. The Orson Welles Cinema remained in operation until 1986, with Welles making a personal appearance there in 1977. Also in 1969, he played a supporting role in John Huston's The Kremlin Letter. Drawn by the numerous offers he received to work in television and films, and upset by a tabloid scandal reporting his affair with Kodar, Welles abandoned the editing of Don Quixote and moved back to America in 1970.

Later career (1970–1985) 

Welles returned to Hollywood, where he continued to self-finance his film and television projects. While offers to act, narrate and host continued, Welles also found himself in great demand on television talk shows. He made frequent appearances for Dick Cavett, Johnny Carson, Dean Martin and Merv Griffin.

Welles's primary focus during his final years was The Other Side of the Wind, a project that was filmed intermittently between 1970 and 1976. Co-written by Welles and Oja Kodar, it is the story of an aging film director (John Huston) looking for funds to complete his final film. The cast includes Peter Bogdanovich, Susan Strasberg, Norman Foster, Edmond O'Brien, Cameron Mitchell and Dennis Hopper. Financed by Iranian backers, ownership of the film fell into a legal quagmire after the Shah of Iran was deposed. The legal disputes kept the film in its unfinished state until early 2017 and it was finally released in November 2018.

Welles portrayed Louis XVIII of France in the 1970 film Waterloo, and narrated the beginning and ending scenes of the historical comedy Start the Revolution Without Me (1970).

In 1971, Welles directed a short adaptation of Moby-Dick, a one-man performance on a bare stage, reminiscent of his 1955 stage production Moby Dick – Rehearsed. Never completed, it was eventually released by the Filmmuseum München. He also appeared in Ten Days' Wonder, co-starring with Anthony Perkins and directed by Claude Chabrol (who reciprocated with a bit part as himself in Other Wind), based on a detective novel by Ellery Queen. That same year, the Academy of Motion Picture Arts and Sciences gave him an Academy Honorary Award "for superlative artistry and versatility in the creation of motion pictures." Welles pretended to be out of town and sent John Huston to claim the award, thanking the academy on film. In his speech, Huston criticized the academy for presenting the award while refusing to support Welles's projects.

In 1972, Welles acted as on-screen narrator for the film documentary version of Alvin Toffler's 1970 book Future Shock. Working again for a British producer, Welles played Long John Silver in director John Hough's Treasure Island (1972), an adaptation of the Robert Louis Stevenson novel, which had been the second story broadcast by The Mercury Theatre on the Air in 1938. This was the last time he played the lead role in a major film. Welles also contributed to the script, although his writing credit was attributed to the pseudonym 'O. W. Jeeves'. In some versions of the film Welles's original recorded dialog was redubbed by Robert Rietty.

In 1973, Welles completed F for Fake, a personal essay film about art forger Elmyr de Hory and the biographer Clifford Irving. Based on an existing documentary by François Reichenbach, it included new material with Oja Kodar, Joseph Cotten, Paul Stewart and William Alland. An excerpt of Welles's 1930s War of the Worlds broadcast was recreated for this film; however, none of the dialogue heard in the film actually matches what was originally broadcast. Welles filmed a five-minute trailer, rejected in the U.S., that featured several shots of a topless Kodar.

Welles hosted a British syndicated anthology series, Orson Welles's Great Mysteries, during the 1973–74 television season. His brief introductions to the 26 half-hour episodes were shot in July 1973 by Gary Graver. The year 1974 also saw Welles lending his voice for that year's remake of Agatha Christie's classic thriller Ten Little Indians produced by his former associate, Harry Alan Towers and starring an international cast that included Oliver Reed, Elke Sommer and Herbert Lom.

In 1975, Welles narrated the documentary Bugs Bunny: Superstar, focusing on Warner Bros. cartoons from the 1940s. Also in 1975, the American Film Institute presented Welles with its third Lifetime Achievement Award (the first two going to director John Ford and actor James Cagney). At the ceremony, Welles screened two scenes from the nearly finished The Other Side of the Wind.

In 1976, Paramount Television purchased the rights for the entire set of Rex Stout's Nero Wolfe stories for Orson Welles. Welles had once wanted to make a series of Nero Wolfe movies, but Rex Stout—who was leery of Hollywood adaptations during his lifetime after two disappointing 1930s films—turned him down. Paramount planned to begin with an ABC-TV movie and hoped to persuade Welles to continue the role in a miniseries. Frank D. Gilroy was signed to write the television script and direct the TV movie on the assurance that Welles would star, but by April 1977 Welles had bowed out. In 1980 the Associated Press reported "the distinct possibility" that Welles would star in a Nero Wolfe TV series for NBC television. Again, Welles bowed out of the project due to creative differences and William Conrad was cast in the role.

In 1979, Welles completed his documentary Filming Othello, which featured Michael MacLiammoir and Hilton Edwards. Made for West German television, it was also released in theaters. That same year, Welles completed his self-produced pilot for The Orson Welles Show television series, featuring interviews with Burt Reynolds, Jim Henson and Frank Oz and guest-starring the Muppets and Angie Dickinson. Unable to find network interest, the pilot was never broadcast. Also in 1979, Welles appeared in the biopic The Secret of Nikola Tesla, and a cameo in The Muppet Movie as Lew Lord.

Beginning in the late 1970s, Welles participated in a series of famous television commercial advertisements. For two years he was on-camera spokesman for the Paul Masson Vineyards, and sales grew by one third during the time Welles intoned what became a popular catchphrase: "We will sell no wine before its time." He was also the voice behind the long-running Carlsberg "Probably the best lager in the world" campaign, promoted Domecq sherry on British television and provided narration on adverts for Findus, though the actual adverts have been overshadowed by a famous blooper reel of voice recordings, known as the Frozen Peas reel. He also did commercials for the Preview Subscription Television Service seen on stations around the country including WCLQ/Cleveland, KNDL/St. Louis and WSMW/Boston. As money ran short, he began directing commercials to make ends meet, including the famous British "Follow the Bear" commercials for Hofmeister lager.

In 1981, Welles hosted the documentary The Man Who Saw Tomorrow, about Renaissance-era prophet Nostradamus. In 1982, the BBC broadcast The Orson Welles Story in the Arena series. Interviewed by Leslie Megahey, Welles examined his past in great detail, and several people from his professional past were interviewed as well. It was reissued in 1990 as With Orson Welles: Stories of a Life in Film. Welles provided narration for the tracks "Defender" from Manowar's 1987 album Fighting the World and "Dark Avenger" on their 1982 album, Battle Hymns. He also recorded the concert introduction for the live performances of Manowar that says, "Ladies and gentlemen, from the United States of America, all hail Manowar." Manowar have been using this introduction for all of their concerts since then.

During the 1980s, Welles worked on such film projects as The Dreamers, based on two stories by Isak Dinesen and starring Oja Kodar, and Orson Welles' Magic Show, which reused material from his failed TV pilot. Another project he worked on was Filming the Trial, the second in a proposed series of documentaries examining his feature films. While much was shot for these projects, none of them was completed. All of them were eventually released by the Filmmuseum München.

In 1984, Welles narrated the short-lived television series Scene of the Crime. During the early years of Magnum, P.I., Welles was the voice of the unseen character Robin Masters, a famous writer and playboy. Welles's death forced this minor character to largely be written out of the series. In an oblique homage to Welles, the Magnum, P.I. producers ambiguously concluded that story arc by having one character accuse another of having hired an actor to portray Robin Masters. He also, in this penultimate year released a music single, titled "I Know What It Is to Be Young (But You Don't Know What It Is to Be Old)", which he recorded under Italian label Compagnia Generale del Disco. The song was performed with the Nick Perito Orchestra and the Ray Charles Singers and produced by Jerry Abbott (father of guitarist "Dimebag Darrell" Abbott).

The last film roles before Welles's death included voice work in the animated films Enchanted Journey (1984) and the animated film The Transformers: The Movie (1986), in which he provided the voice for the planet-eating supervillain Unicron. His last film appearance was in Henry Jaglom's 1987 independent film Someone to Love, released two years after his death but produced before his voice-over in Transformers: The Movie. His last television appearance was on the television show Moonlighting. He recorded an introduction to an episode entitled "The Dream Sequence Always Rings Twice," which was partially filmed in black and white. The episode aired five days after his death and was dedicated to his memory.

In the mid-1980s, Henry Jaglom taped lunch conversations with Welles at Los Angeles's Ma Maison as well as in New York. Edited transcripts of these sessions appear in Peter Biskind's 2013 book My Lunches With Orson: Conversations Between Henry Jaglom and Orson Welles.

Personal life

Relationships and family 

Orson Welles and Chicago-born actress and socialite Virginia Nicolson (1916–1996) were married on November 14, 1934. "Regardless of his later comments, the two were very much in love," wrote biographer Patrick McGilligan, "and she was his salvation." The couple separated in December 1939 and were divorced on February 1, 1940. After bearing with Welles's romances in New York, Virginia had learned that Welles had fallen in love with Mexican actress Dolores del Río.

Infatuated with her since adolescence, Welles met del Río at Darryl Zanuck's ranch soon after he moved to Hollywood in 1939. Their relationship was kept secret until 1941, when del Río filed for divorce from her second husband. They openly appeared together in New York while Welles was directing the Mercury stage production Native Son. They acted together in the movie Journey into Fear (1943). Their relationship came to an end due, among other things, to Welles's infidelities. Del Río returned to Mexico in 1943, shortly before Welles married Rita Hayworth.

Welles married Rita Hayworth on September 7, 1943. They were divorced on November 10, 1947. During his last interview, recorded for The Merv Griffin Show on the evening before his death, Welles called Hayworth "one of the dearest and sweetest women that ever lived ... and we were a long time together—I was lucky enough to have been with her longer than any of the other men in her life."

In 1955, Welles married actress Paola Mori (née Countess Paola di Gerfalco), an Italian aristocrat who starred as Raina Arkadin in his 1955 film, Mr. Arkadin. The couple began a passionate affair, and they were married at her parents' insistence. They were wed in London May 8, 1955, and never divorced.

Croatian-born artist and actress Oja Kodar became Welles's long-time companion both personally and professionally from 1966 onward, and they lived together for some of the last twenty years of his life.

Welles had three daughters from his marriages: Christopher Welles Feder (born 1938, with Virginia Nicolson); Rebecca Welles Manning (1944–2004), with Rita Hayworth; and Beatrice Welles (born 1955, with Paola Mori).

Welles is thought to have had a son, British director Michael Lindsay-Hogg (born 1940), with Irish actress Geraldine Fitzgerald, then the wife of Sir Edward Lindsay-Hogg, 4th baronet. When Lindsay-Hogg was 16, his mother reluctantly divulged pervasive rumors that his father was Welles, and she denied them—but in such detail that he doubted her veracity. Fitzgerald evaded the subject for the rest of her life. Lindsay-Hogg knew Welles, worked with him in the theatre and met him at intervals throughout Welles's life. After learning that Welles's oldest daughter, Chris, his childhood playmate, had long suspected that he was her brother, Lindsay-Hogg initiated a DNA test that proved inconclusive. In his 2011 autobiography, Lindsay-Hogg reported that his questions were resolved by his mother's close friend Gloria Vanderbilt, who wrote that Fitzgerald had told her that Welles was his father. A 2015 Welles biography by Patrick McGilligan, however, reports the impossibility of Welles's paternity: Fitzgerald left the U.S. for Ireland in May 1939, and her son was conceived before her return in late October, whereas Welles did not travel overseas during that period.

After the death of Rebecca Welles Manning, a man named Marc McKerrow was revealed to be her son—and therefore a direct descendant of Orson Welles and Rita Hayworth—after he requested his adoption records unsealed. While McKerrow and Rebecca were never able to meet due to her cancer, they were in touch before her death, and he attended her funeral. McKerrow's reactions to the revelation and his meeting with Oja Kodar are documented in the 2008 film Prodigal Sons by his sister Kim Reed. McKerrow died on June 18, 2010, suddenly in his sleep at the age of 44. His death was "...caused by complications from a nocturnal seizure" related to a car accident and resulting injury when he was younger.

In the 1940s, Welles had a brief relationship with Maila Nurmi, who, according to the bio Glamour Ghoul: The Passions and Pain of the Real Vampira, Maila Nurmi, became pregnant; since Welles was at the time married to Hayworth, Nurmi gave the child up for adoption. However, the child mentioned in the book was born in 1944. Nurmi revealed in an interview weeks before her death in January 2008 how she met Welles in a New York casting office in the spring of 1946.

Despite an urban legend promoted by Welles, he is not related to Abraham Lincoln's wartime Secretary of the Navy, Gideon Welles. The myth dates back to the first newspaper feature ever written about Welles—"Cartoonist, Actor, Poet and only 10"—in the February 19, 1926, issue of The Capital Times. The article falsely states that he was descended from "Gideon Welles, who was a member of President Lincoln's cabinet". As presented by Charles Higham in a genealogical chart that introduces his 1985 biography of Welles, Orson Welles's father was Richard Head Welles (born Wells), son of Richard Jones Wells, son of Henry Hill Wells (who had an uncle named Gideon Wells), son of William Hill Wells, son of Richard Wells (1734–1801).

Physical characteristics 

Peter Noble's 1956 biography describes Welles as "a magnificent figure of a man, over six feet tall, handsome, with flashing eyes and a gloriously resonant speaking-voice". Welles said that a voice specialist once told him he was born to be a heldentenor, a heroic tenor, but that when he was young and working at the Gate Theatre in Dublin, he forced his voice down into a bass-baritone.

Even as a baby, Welles was prone to illness, including diphtheria, measles, whooping cough, and malaria. From infancy he suffered from asthma, sinus headaches, and backache that was later found to be caused by congenital anomalies of the spine. Foot and ankle trouble throughout his life was the result of flat feet. "As he grew older", Brady wrote, "his ill health was exacerbated by the late hours he was allowed to keep [and] an early penchant for alcohol and tobacco".

"Crash diets, [pharmaceutical] drugs, and corsets had slimmed him for his early film roles", wrote biographer Barton Whaley. "Then always back to gargantuan consumption of high-caloric food and booze. By summer 1949, when he was 34, his weight had crept up to a stout . After 1960, he remained permanently obese."

Religious beliefs 

When Peter Bogdanovich once asked him about his religion, Welles gruffly replied that it was none of his business, then misinformed him that he was raised Catholic.

Although the Welles family was no longer devout, it was fourth-generation Episcopalian and before that, Quaker and Puritan.

The funeral of Welles's father, Richard H. Welles, was Episcopalian.

In April 1982, when interviewer Merv Griffin asked him about his religious beliefs, Welles replied, "I try to be a Christian. I don't pray really, because I don't want to bore God." Near the end of his life, Welles was dining at Ma Maison, his favorite restaurant in Los Angeles, when proprietor Patrick Terrail conveyed an invitation from the head of the Greek Orthodox Church, who asked Welles to be his guest of honor at divine liturgy at Saint Sophia Cathedral. Welles replied, "Please tell him I really appreciate that offer, but I am an atheist."

"Orson never joked or teased about the religious beliefs of others", wrote biographer Barton Whaley. "He accepted it as a cultural artifact, suitable for the births, deaths, and marriages of strangers and even some friends—but without emotional or intellectual meaning for himself."

Politics and activism 

Welles was politically active from the beginning of his career. He remained aligned with left-wing politics and the American Left throughout his life, and always defined his political orientation as "progressive". A Democrat, he was an outspoken critic of racism in the United States and the practice of segregation. He was a strong supporter of Franklin D. Roosevelt and the New Deal and often spoke out on radio in support of progressive politics. He campaigned heavily for Roosevelt in the 1944 election. Welles did not support the 1948 presidential bid of Roosevelt's second vice president Henry A. Wallace for the Progressive Party, later describing Wallace as "a prisoner of the Communist Party."p. 66

In a 1983 conversation with his friend Roger Hill, Welles recalled: "During a White House dinner, when I was campaigning for Roosevelt, in a toast, with considerable tongue in cheek, he said, 'Orson, you and I are the two greatest actors alive today.' In private that evening, and on several other occasions, he urged me to run for a Senate seat in either California or Wisconsin. He wasn't alone." In the 1980s, Welles still expressed admiration for Roosevelt but also described his presidency as "a semidictatorship."p. 187

During a 1970 appearance on The Dick Cavett Show, Welles claimed to have met Hitler while hiking in Austria with a teacher who was a "budding Nazi". He said that Hitler made no impression on him at all and does not remember him. He said that he had no personality at all: "He was invisible. There was nothing there until there were 5,000 people yelling sieg heil."

In 1946, Welles took to the airwaves in a series of radio broadcasts demanding justice for a decorated Black veteran Isaac Woodard, who had been beaten and blinded by white police officers. Welles devoted his July 28, 1946 program to reading Woodard's affidavit and vowing to bring the officer responsible to justice. He continued his crusade over four subsequent Sunday afternoon broadcasts on ABC Radio. “The NAACP felt that these broadcasts did more than anything else to prompt the Justice Department to act on the case,” the Museum of Broadcasting stated in its 1988 retrospect Orson Welles on the Air: The Radio Years.

For several years, he wrote a newspaper column on political issues and considered running for the U.S. Senate in 1946, representing his home state of Wisconsin—a seat that was ultimately won by Joseph McCarthy.

Welles's political activities were reported on pages 155–157 of Red Channels, the anti-Communist publication that, in part, fueled the already flourishing Hollywood Blacklist. He was in Europe during the height of the Red Scare, thereby adding one more reason for the Hollywood establishment to ostracize him.

In 1970, Welles narrated (but did not write) a satirical political record on the rise of President Richard Nixon titled The Begatting of the President.

Welles spoke before a crowd of 700,000 at a nuclear disarmament rally in Central Park on June 12, 1982, and attacked the policies of President Ronald Reagan and the Republican party.

American: An Odyssey to 1947, a documentary by Danny Wu that looks at Welles's life against the political landscape of the 1930s and 1940s, had its premiere at the Newport Beach Film Festival in October 2022.

Death and tributes 

On the evening of October 9, 1985, Welles recorded his final interview on the syndicated TV program The Merv Griffin Show, appearing with biographer Barbara Leaming. "Both Welles and Leaming talked of Welles's life, and the segment was a nostalgic interlude," wrote biographer Frank Brady. Welles returned to his house in Hollywood and worked into the early hours typing stage directions for the project he and Gary Graver were planning to shoot at UCLA the following day. Welles died sometime on the morning of October 10, following a heart attack. He was found by his chauffeur at around 10 a.m.; the first of Welles's friends to arrive was Paul Stewart. Welles was 70 years old at his death.

Welles was cremated by prior agreement with the executor of his estate, Greg Garrison, whose advice about making lucrative TV appearances in the 1970s made it possible for Welles to pay off a portion of the taxes he owed the IRS. A brief private funeral was attended by Paola Mori and Welles's three daughters—the first time they had ever been together. Only a few close friends were invited: Garrison, Graver, Roger Hill and Prince Alessandro Tasca di Cuto. Chris Welles Feder later described the funeral as an awful experience.

A public memorial tribute took place November 2, 1985, at the Directors Guild of America Theater in Los Angeles. Host Peter Bogdanovich introduced speakers including Charles Champlin, Geraldine Fitzgerald, Greg Garrison, Charlton Heston, Roger Hill, Henry Jaglom, Arthur Knight, Oja Kodar, Barbara Leaming, Janet Leigh, Norman Lloyd, Dan O'Herlihy, Patrick Terrail and Robert Wise.

"I know what his feelings were regarding his death", Joseph Cotten later wrote. "He did not want a funeral; he wanted to be buried quietly in a little place in Spain. He wanted no memorial services ..." Cotten declined to attend the memorial program; instead, he sent a short message, ending with the last two lines of a Shakespeare sonnet that Welles had sent him on his most recent birthday:

But if the while I think on thee, dear friend,All losses are restored and sorrows end.Bogdanovich, who was directed by Welles in The Other Side of the Wind, wrote that "being directed by Welles was like breathing pure oxygen all day long. He was so totally in control that he never had to prove a point out of any kind. I never saw him get angry or impatient, or raise his voice in any way but hilarity... Sometimes Orson was holding the camera himself, but wherever the camera was, he had put it there, and all the lights were placed exactly where he said they were to be put. There wasn't anything seen or heard in any scene that wasn't there because Orson wanted it that way, but he was never dictatorial."

In 1987 the ashes of Welles were taken to Ronda, Spain, and buried in an old well covered by flowers on the rural estate of a long-time friend, bullfighter Antonio Ordóñez.

Unfinished projects 

Welles's reliance on self-production meant that many of his later projects were filmed piecemeal or were not completed. Welles financed his later projects through his own fundraising activities. He often also took on other work to obtain money to fund his own films.

Don Quixote 

In the mid-1950s, Welles began work on Don Quixote, initially a commission from CBS television. Welles expanded the film to feature length, developing the screenplay to take Quixote and Sancho Panza into the modern age. Filming stopped with the death of Francisco Reiguera, the actor playing Quixote, in 1969. Orson Welles continued editing the film into the early 1970s. At the time of his death, the film remained largely a collection of footage in various states of editing. The project and, more important, Welles's conception of the project changed radically over time.

A version Oja Kodar supervised, with help from Jess Franco, assistant director during production, was released in 1992 to poor reviews.

Frederick Muller, the film editor for The Trial, Chimes at Midnight, and the CBS Special Orson Bag, worked on editing three reels of the original, unadulterated version. When asked in 2013 by a journalist of Time Out for his opinion, he said that he felt that if released without image re-editing but with the addition of ad hoc sound and music, it probably would have been rather successful.

The Merchant of Venice 

In 1969, Welles was given a TV commission to film a condensed adaptation of The Merchant of Venice. Welles completed the film by 1970, but the finished negative was later mysteriously stolen from his Rome production office. A restored and reconstructed version of the film, made by using the original script and composer's notes, premiered at pre-opening ceremonies of the 72nd Venice International Film Festival, alongside Othello, in 2015.

The Other Side of the Wind 

In 1970, Welles began shooting The Other Side of the Wind. The film relates the efforts of a film director (played by John Huston) to complete his last Hollywood picture and is largely set at a lavish party. By 1972 the filming was reported by Welles as being "96% complete", though by 1979 Welles had only edited about 40 minutes of the film. In that year, legal complications over the ownership of the film put the negative into a Paris vault. In 2004, director Peter Bogdanovich, who acted in the film, announced his intention to complete the production.

On October 28, 2014, Los Angeles-based production company Royal Road Entertainment announced it had negotiated an agreement, with the assistance of producer Frank Marshall, and would purchase the rights to complete and release The Other Side of the Wind. Bogdanovich and Marshall planned to complete Welles's nearly finished film in Los Angeles, aiming to have it ready for screening on May 6, 2015, the 100th anniversary of Welles's birth. Royal Road Entertainment and German producer Jens Koethner Kaul acquired the rights held by Les Films de l'Astrophore and the late Mehdi Boushehri. They reached an agreement with Oja Kodar, who inherited Welles's ownership of the film, and Beatrice Welles, manager of the Welles estate; but at the end of 2015, efforts to complete the film were at an impasse.

In March 2017, Netflix acquired distribution rights to the film. That month, the original negative, dailies and other footage arrived in Los Angeles for post-production; the film was completed in 2018. The film premiered at the 75th Venice International Film Festival on August 31, 2018.

On November 2, 2018, the film debuted in select theaters and Netflix, 48 years after principal photography began.

Some footage is included in the documentaries Working with Orson Welles (1993), Orson Welles: One Man Band (1995), and most extensively They'll Love Me When I'm Dead (2018).

Other unfinished films and unfilmed screenplays

Too Much Johnson 

Too Much Johnson is a 1938 comedy film written and directed by Welles. Designed as the cinematic aspect of Welles's Mercury Theatre stage presentation of William Gillette's 1894 comedy, the film was not completely edited or publicly screened. Too Much Johnson was considered a lost film until August 2013, with news reports that a pristine print had been discovered in Italy in 2008. A copy restored by the George Eastman House museum was scheduled to premiere October 9, 2013, at the Pordenone Silent Film Festival, with a U.S. premiere to follow. The film was shown at a single screening at the Los Angeles County Museum of Art on May 3, 2014.  A single performance of Too Much Johnson, on February 2, 2015, at the Film Forum in New York City, was a great success. Produced by Bruce Goldstein and adapted and directed by Allen Lewis Rickman, it featured the Film Forum Players with live piano.

Heart of Darkness 

Heart of Darkness was Welles's projected first film, in 1940. It was planned in extreme detail and some test shots were filmed; the footage is now lost. It was planned to be entirely shot in long takes from the point of view of the narrator, Marlow, who would be played by Welles; his reflection would occasionally be seen in the window as his boat sailed down river. The project was abandoned because it could not be delivered on budget, and Citizen Kane was made instead.

Santa 

In 1941, Welles planned a film with his then partner, the Mexican actress Dolores del Río. Santa was adapted from the novel by Mexican writer Federico Gamboa. The film would have marked the debut of Dolores del Río in the Mexican cinema. Welles made a correction of the script in 13 extraordinary sequences. The high salary demanded by del Río stopped the project. In 1943, the film was finally completed with the settings of Welles, led by Norman Foster and starring Mexican actress Esther Fernández.

The Way to Santiago 

In 1941 Welles also planned a Mexican drama with Dolores del Río, which he gave to RKO to be budgeted. The film was a movie version of the novel by the same name by Calder Marshall. In the story, del Río would play Elena Medina, "the most beautiful girl in the world", with Welles playing an American who becomes entangled in a mission to disrupt a Nazi plot to overthrow the Mexican government. Welles planned to shoot in Mexico, but the Mexican government had to approve the story, and this never occurred.

The Life of Christ 

In 1941, Welles received the support of Bishop Fulton Sheen for a retelling of the life of Christ, to be set in the American West in the 1890s. After filming of Citizen Kane was complete, Welles, Perry Ferguson, and Gregg Toland scouted locations in Baja California and Mexico. Welles wrote a screenplay with dialogue from the Gospels of Mark, Matthew, and Luke. "Every word in the film was to be from the Bible—no original dialogue, but done as a sort of American primitive," Welles said, "set in the frontier country in the last century." The unrealized project was revisited by Welles in the 1950s, when he wrote a second unfilmed screenplay, to be shot in Egypt.

It's All True 

Welles did not originally want to direct It's All True, a 1942 documentary about South America, but after its abandonment by RKO, he spent much of the 1940s attempting to buy the negative of his material from RKO, so that he could edit and release it in some form. The footage remained unseen in vaults for decades and was assumed lost. Over 50 years later, some (but not all) of the surviving material saw release in the 1993 documentary It's All True: Based on an Unfinished Film by Orson Welles.

Monsieur Verdoux 

In 1944, Welles wrote the first-draft script of Monsieur Verdoux, a film that he also intended to direct. Charlie Chaplin initially agreed to star in it, but later changed his mind, citing never having been directed by someone else in a feature before. Chaplin bought the film rights and made the film himself in 1947, with some changes. The final film credits Chaplin with the script, "based on an idea by Orson Welles".

Cyrano de Bergerac 

Welles spent around nine months around 1947–48 co-writing the screenplay for Cyrano de Bergerac along with Ben Hecht, a project Welles was assigned to direct for Alexander Korda. He began scouting for locations in Europe whilst filming Black Magic, but Korda was short of money, so sold the rights to Columbia pictures, who eventually dismissed Welles from the project, and then sold the rights to United Artists, who in turn made a film version in 1950, which was not based on Welles's script.

Around the World in Eighty Days 

After Welles's elaborate musical stage version of this Jules Verne novel, encompassing 38 different sets, went live in 1946, Welles shot some test footage in Morocco in 1947 for a film version. The footage was never edited, funding never came through, and Welles abandoned the project. Nine years later, the stage show's producer Mike Todd made his own award-winning film version of the book.

Moby Dick – Rehearsed 

Moby Dick – Rehearsed was a film version of Welles's 1955 London meta-play, starring Gordon Jackson, Christopher Lee, Patrick McGoohan, and with Welles as Ahab. Using bare, minimalist sets, Welles alternated between a cast of nineteenth-century actors rehearsing a production of Moby Dick, with scenes from Moby Dick itself. Kenneth Williams, a cast member who was apprehensive about the entire project, recorded in his autobiography that Welles's dim, atmospheric stage lighting made some of the footage so dark as to be unwatchable. The entire play was filmed but is now presumed lost. This was made during one weekend at the Hackney Empire theater.

Histoires extraordinaires 

The producers of Histoires extraordinaires, a 1968 anthology film based on short stories by Edgar Allan Poe, announced in June 1967 that Welles would direct one segment based on both "Masque of the Red Death" and "The Cask of Amontillado" for the omnibus film. Welles withdrew in September 1967 and was replaced. The script, written in English by Welles and Oja Kodar, is in the Filmmuseum Munchen collection.

One-Man Band 

This Monty Python-esque spoof in which Welles plays all but one of the characters (including two characters in drag), was made around 1968–9. Welles intended this completed sketch to be one of several items in a television special on London. Other items filmed for this special—all included in the "One Man Band" documentary by his partner Oja Kodar—comprised a sketch on Winston Churchill (played in silhouette by Welles), a sketch on peers in a stately home, a feature on London gentlemen's clubs, and a sketch featuring Welles being mocked by his snide Savile Row tailor (played by Charles Gray).

Treasure Island 

Welles wrote two screenplays for Treasure Island in the 1960s, and was eager to seek financial backing to direct it. His plan was to film it in Spain in concert with Chimes at Midnight. Welles intended to play the part of Long John Silver. He wanted Keith Baxter to play Doctor Livesey and John Gielgud to take on the role of Squire Trelawney. Australian-born child actor Fraser MacIntosh (The Boy Cried Murder), then 11-years old, was cast as Jim Hawkins and flown to Spain for the shoot, which would have been directed by Jess Franco. About 70 percent of the Chimes at Midnight cast would have had roles in Treasure Island. However, funding for the project fell through.   Eventually, Welles's own screenplay (under the pseudonym of O.W. Jeeves) was further rewritten, and formed the basis of the 1972 film version directed by John Hough, in which Welles played Long John Silver.

The Deep 

The Deep, an adaptation of Charles Williams's Dead Calm, was entirely set on two boats and shot mostly in close-ups. It was filmed off the coasts of Yugoslavia and the Bahamas between 1966 and 1969, with all but one scene completed. It was originally planned as a commercially viable thriller, to show that Welles could make a popular, successful film. It was put on hold in 1970 when Welles worried that critics would not respond favorably to this film as his theatrical follow-up to the much-lauded Chimes at Midnight, and Welles focused instead on F for Fake. It was abandoned altogether in 1973, perhaps due to the death of its star Laurence Harvey. In a 2015 interview, Oja Kodar blamed Welles's failure to complete the film on Jeanne Moreau's refusal to participate in its dubbing.

Dune 

Dune, an early attempt at adapting Frank Herbert's sci-fi novel by Chilean film director Alejandro Jodorowsky, was to star Welles as the evil Baron Vladimir Harkonnen. Jodorowsky had personally chosen Welles for the role, but the planned film never advanced past pre-production.

Saint Jack 

In 1978 Welles was lined up by his long-time protégé Peter Bogdanovich (who was then acting as Welles's de facto agent) to direct Saint Jack, an adaptation of the 1973 Paul Theroux novel about an American pimp in Singapore. Hugh Hefner and Bogdanovich's then-partner Cybill Shepherd were both attached to the project as producers, with Hefner providing finance through his Playboy productions. However, both Hefner and Shepherd became convinced that Bogdanovich himself would be a more commercially viable director than Welles and insisted that Bogdanovich take over. Since Bogdanovich was also in need of work after a series of box office flops, he agreed. When the film was finally made in 1979 by Bogdanovich and Hefner (but without Welles or Shepherd's participation), Welles felt betrayed and according to Bogdanovich the two "drifted apart a bit".

Filming The Trial 

After the success of his 1978 film Filming Othello made for West German television, and mostly consisting of a monolog to the camera, Welles began shooting scenes for this follow-up film, but never completed it.  What Welles did film was an 80-minute question-and-answer session in 1981 with film students asking about the film. The footage was kept by Welles's cinematographer Gary Graver, who donated it to the Munich Film Museum, which then pieced it together with Welles's trailer for the film, into an 83-minute film which is occasionally screened at film festivals.

The Big Brass Ring 

Written by Welles with Oja Kodar, The Big Brass Ring was adapted and filmed by director George Hickenlooper in partnership with writer F.X. Feeney. Both the Welles script and the 1999 film center on a U.S. presidential hopeful in his 40s, his elderly mentor—a former candidate for the Presidency, brought low by homosexual scandal—and the Italian journalist probing for the truth of the relationship between these men. During the last years of his life, Welles struggled to get financing for the planned film, and his efforts to cast a star as the main character were unsuccessful. Jack Nicholson, Robert Redford, Warren Beatty, Clint Eastwood, Burt Reynolds and Paul Newman turned down the role for various reasons.

The Cradle Will Rock 
In 1984, Welles wrote the screenplay for a film he planned to direct, an autobiographical drama about the 1937 staging of The Cradle Will Rock. Rupert Everett was slated to play the young Welles. However, Welles was unable to acquire funding. Tim Robbins wrote and directed a 1999 historical drama film that fictionalizes the true events.

King Lear 

At the time of his death, Welles was in talks with a French production company to direct a film version of the Shakespeare play King Lear, in which he would also play the title role.

Ada or Ardor: A Family Chronicle 

Ada or Ardor: A Family Chronicle was an adaptation of Vladimir Nabokov's novel. Welles admired Nabokov's Ada or Ardor: A Family Chronicle and initiated a film project of the same title in collaboration with the author. Welles flew to Paris to discuss the project personally with Nabokov, because at that time the Russian author moved from America to Europe. Welles and Nabokov had a promising discussion, but the project was not finished.

Theatre credits

Radio credits

Filmography

Discography

Awards and honors 

 1933: Welles's stage production of Twelfth Night for the Todd School for Boys received first prize from the Chicago Drama League after competition at the Century of Progress Exposition of 1933, the Chicago World's Fair.
 1938: As director of the Mercury Theatre, Welles received the New York Drama Study Club Award for "the greatest contribution toward a living, breathing theatre this season".
 1939: For "his most conspicuous contribution this last year to the theatre and to radio drama," Welles received the Essex County Symphony Society's first annual Achievement Award.
 1941: Citizen Kane received the New York Film Critics Circle Award for Best Picture.
 1942: The National Board of Review voted Citizen Kane Best Film of 1941, and recognized Welles for his performance.
 1942: Citizen Kane received nine nominations at the 1941 Academy Awards, including Best Picture, Best Director and Best Actor in a Leading Role for Welles. It won the Academy Award for Best Original Screenplay, an award Welles shared with Herman J. Mankiewicz.
 1943: The Magnificent Ambersons was nominated for four 1942 Academy Awards, including Best Picture.
 1945: On May 24, 1945, the Interracial Film and Radio Guild honored Welles for his contributions to interracial harmony through radio. Presented at the Shrine Auditorium in Los Angeles, the guild's second annual awards ceremony also honored Eddie "Rochester" Anderson, Norman Corwin, Bing Crosby, Bette Davis, Lena Horne, James Wong Howe, Earl Robinson, Nathan Straus and Miguel C. Torres.
 1947: The Stranger was nominated for the Golden Lion at the Venice Film Festival.
 1952: Othello won the Palme d'Or at the 1952 Cannes Film Festival.
 1958: Although Universal Pictures did its best to prevent Touch of Evil from being selected for the 1958 Brussels World Film Festival—part of the Expo 58 world's fair—the film received its European premiere and Welles was invited to attend. To his astonishment, Welles collected the two top awards. Touch of Evil received the International Critics Prize, and Welles was recognized for his body of work.
 1959: Welles received a special 1958 Peabody Award for The Fountain of Youth, the only unsold TV pilot ever so honored.
 1959: For their ensemble work in Compulsion, Orson Welles, Bradford Dillman and Dean Stockwell shared the prize for Best Actor at the Cannes Film Festival.
 1966: Chimes at Midnight was screened in competition for the Palme d'Or at the 1966 Cannes Films Festival and won the 20th Anniversary Prize ("Honneure") and the Technical Grand Prize. In Spain, it won the Citizens Writers Circle Award for Best Film.
 1968: Welles was nominated for Best Foreign Actor in a Leading Role at the 21st British Academy Film Awards for his performance in Chimes at Midnight.
 1970: The Venice Film Festival awarded Welles the Golden Lion for Career Achievement.
 1970: Welles was given an Academy Honorary Award for "superlative and distinguished service in the making of motion pictures." Welles did not attend the ceremony: "I didn't go, because I feel like a damn fool at those things. I feel foolish, really foolish. ... I made a piece of film and said that I was in Spain, and thanked them."
 1975: Welles received the American Film Institute Lifetime Achievement Award.
 1976: Grammy Award for Best Spoken Word or Non-Musical Album for "Great American Documents", shared with Helen Hayes, Henry Fonda and James Earl Jones.
 1978: Welles was presented with the Los Angeles Film Critics Association Career Achievement Award.
 1979: Welles received the Grammy Award for Best Spoken Word Recording for the complete motion picture soundtrack for Citizen Kane.
 1979: Welles was inducted into the National Association of Broadcasters Broadcasting Hall of Fame.
 1981: Welles received a Grammy Award for Best Spoken Word Recording for his role on Donovan's Brain.
 1982: In Paris on February 23, 1982, President François Mitterrand presented Welles with the Order of Commander of the Légion d'honneur, the highest civilian decoration in France.
 1982: Welles was nominated for Best Supporting Actor in a Motion Picture at the Golden Globe Awards for his role in Butterfly, the same role that had him nominated for the Golden Raspberry Award for Worst Supporting Actor, won by Ed McMahon in the same film, which also won the award for Worst Picture.
 1983: Welles was made a member of the Académie des Beaux-Arts.
 1983: Welles was an inaugural recipient of the British Film Institute Fellowship.
 1984: The Directors Guild of America presented Welles with its greatest honor, the D. W. Griffith Award.
 1984: Welles received a Special Fellowship from The Academy of Magical Arts.
 1985: Welles received the Career Achievement Award from the National Board of Review.
 1988: Welles was inducted into the National Radio Hall of Fame.
 1993: The 1992 audiobook version of This is Orson Welles by Welles and Peter Bogdanovich was nominated for a Grammy Award for Best Spoken Word or Non-Musical Album.
 1998: In 1998 and 2007, the American Film Institute ranked Citizen Kane as the greatest American movie. These other Welles films were nominated for the AFI list: The Magnificent Ambersons (1942, director/producer/screenwriter); The Third Man (1949, actor); Touch of Evil (1958, actor/director/screenwriter); and A Man for All Seasons (1966, actor).
 1999: The American Film Institute acknowledged Welles as one of the top 25 male motion picture stars of Classic Hollywood cinema in its survey, AFI's 100 Years...100 Stars.
 2002: Welles was voted the greatest film director of all time in two British Film Institute polls, of directors and critics.
 2002: A highly divergent genus of Hawaiian spiders Orsonwelles was named in his honor.
 2003: A crater on Mars was named in his honor.
 2007: A statue of Welles sculpted by Oja Kodar was installed in the city of Split, Croatia.
 2013: On February 10, 2013, the Woodstock Opera House in Woodstock, Illinois, dedicated its stage to Welles, honoring the site of his American debut as a professional theatre director.
 2015: Throughout 2015, numerous festivals and events observed the 100th anniversary of Welles's birth.
 2017: A survey of critical consensus, best-of lists, and historical retrospectives finds Welles to be the second most acclaimed director of all time (behind Alfred Hitchcock).

Cultural references 

 Director Peter Jackson cast Montreal actor Jean Guérin as Welles in his 1994 film, Heavenly Creatures.
 Vincent D'Onofrio portrayed Welles in a cameo appearance in Tim Burton's 1994 film, Ed Wood, where he briefly appears and encourages the eponymous filmmaker to fight for making his movies his own way in spite of his producers.
 Voice actor Maurice LaMarche is known for his Welles impression, heard in Ed Wood (in which he dubbed the dialog of Vincent D'Onofrio); the 1994–95 primetime animated series, The Critic; a 2006 episode of The Simpsons; and a 2011 episode of Futurama for which LaMarche won an Emmy Award. The voice he created for the character Brain from the animated series Animaniacs and Pinky and the Brain was largely influenced by Welles.
 The 1996 film The Battle Over Citizen Kane, which chronicles the conflict between Welles and Hearst, was nominated for an Academy Award for Best Documentary Feature.
 Welles is a recurring character in the Anno Dracula series by author and critic Kim Newman, appearing in Dracula Cha Cha Cha (1998) and Johnny Alucard (2013).
 In 1999 Welles appeared on a U.S. postage stamp in a scene from Citizen Kane. The United States Postal Service was petitioned to honor Welles with a stamp in 2015, the 100th anniversary of his birth, but the effort did not succeed.
 The 1999 HBO docudrama, RKO 281, tells the story of the making of Citizen Kane, starring Liev Schreiber as Orson Welles.
 Tim Robbins's 1999 film Cradle Will Rock chronicles the process and events surrounding Welles and John Houseman's production of the 1937 musical by Marc Blitzstein. Welles is played by actor Angus MacFadyen.
 Austin Pendleton's 2000 play, Orson's Shadow, concerns the 1960 London production of Eugène Ionesco's play Rhinoceros directed by Welles and starring Laurence Olivier. First presented by the Steppenwolf Theatre Company in 2000, the play opened off-Broadway in 2005 and had its European premiere in London in 2015.
 In Michael Chabon's 2000 Pulitzer Prize-winning novel The Amazing Adventures of Kavalier & Clay, the protagonists meet Orson Welles and attend the premiere of Citizen Kane.
 In the film Fade to Black (2006), a fictional thriller set during Welles's 1948 journey to Rome to star in the movie Black Magic, Danny Huston stars as Welles.
 Me and Orson Welles (2009), based on Robert Kaplow's 2003 novel, stars Zac Efron as a teenager who convinces Welles (Christian McKay) to cast him in his 1937 production of Julius Caesar. McKay received numerous accolades for his performance, including a BAFTA nomination.
 Welles is the central character in "Ian, George, and George," a novelette by Paul Levinson published in 2013 in Analog Science Fiction and Fact magazine.
 In 2014 comedic actor Jack Black portrayed Welles in the sketch comedy show Drunk History.
 A 2014 documentary by Chuck Workman, Magician: The Astonishing Life and Work of Orson Welles, was released to critical acclaim.
 Rapper Logic samples Orson Welles twice on his 2020 album No Pressure, with a portion of the August 11, 1946 "Orson Welles Commentaries" episode featured as the outro to the album, titled Obediently Yours.
 Tom Burke portrayed Welles in David Fincher's 2020 film, Mank, which focuses on Herman J. Mankiewicz, the co-writer of Citizen Kane.
 Welles is portrayed by three avatars as he comes to grips with his own death in the 2020 filmopera Orson Rehearsed by composer director Daron Hagen.

Notes

References

Further reading

Documentaries about Orson Welles 
 Baratier, Jacques, Désordre, 1950.
 Albert and David Maysles, Orson Welles in Spain, 1966.
 Reichenbach, François and Rossif, Frédéric, Orson Welles, 1968 (ORTF, French TV).
 Rozier, Jacques, Vive le cinéma !, 1972, (ORTF, French TV).
 Marienstras, Richard and Romero, Isidro, Shakespeare et Orson Welles, 1973 (French TV).
 Philippe, Claude-Jean and Lefebvre, Monique, Une légende, une vie : Citizen Welles, 1974 (French TV).
 Orson Welles talks with Roger Hill and Hortense Hill, Sedona, Arizona, 1978.
 Megahey, Leslie and Yentob, Alan, The Orson Welles Story, 1982 (Arena, BBC-TV).
 Boutang, Pierre-André and Seligmann, Guy, Orson Welles à la cinémathèque (française), 1983.
 Graver, Gary, Working with Orson Welles, 1993.
 Giorgini, Ciro and Giagni, Gianfranco, Rosabella: La Storia italiana di Orson Welles, 1993.
 Silovic, Vassili with Kodar Oja, Orson Welles : The One-Man Band, 1995.
 Rodriguez, Carlos, Orson Welles en el país de Don Quijote, 2000.
 Petri, Kristian, Brunnen, 2005.
 France, Richard and Fischer, Robert, Citizen America: Orson Welles and the ballad of Isaac Woodard, 2005.
 Rafaelic, Daniel and Rizmaul, Leon, "Druga strana Wellesa", 2005.
 Sedlar, Dominik and Sedlar, Jakov, Searching for Orson, 2006.
 Bernard, Jean-Jacques, Welles angels, 2007.
 Workman, Chuck, Magician: The Astonishing Life and Work of Orson Welles, 2014.
 Kuperberg, Julia and Kuperberg, Clara, This is Orson Welles, 2015.
 Kapnist, Elisabeth, Orson Welles, shadows & light, 2015.
 Mark Cousins, The eyes of Orson Welles, 2018.
 Danny Wu, American: An Odyssey to 1947, 2022.

Documentaries on Citizen Kane (1941) 
 The legacy of Citizen Kane (included in the Criterion 50th Anniversary Edition LaserDisc), 1992.
 Reflections on Citizen Kane (included in the Turner Home Entertainment 50th Anniversary Edition VHS), 1991.
 The complete Citizen Kane, (BBC-TV), 1991.
 Epstein, Michael and Thomas Lennon, The Battle Over Citizen Kane, (PBS The American Experience, 1996)

Documentaries on It's All True (1942) 
 Sganzerla,Rogério, Nem Tudo é Verdade, 1986.
 Krohn, Bill, Meisen, Myron and Wilson, Richard, It's All True: Based on an Unfinished Film by Orson Welles, 1993.

Documentary on Mr. Arkadin (1955) 
 Drössler, Stefan, The Labyrinths of Mr. Arkadin, Munich Filmmuseum, 2000.

Documentary on Touch of Evil (1958) 
 The Restoration of Touch of Evil, 1998.

Documentary on Chimes at Midnight (1965) 
 Berriatúa, Luciano, Las versiones de Campanadas a medianoche, 2012.

Documentaries on The Other Side of the Wind (1970–1976) 
 Neville, Morgan, They'll Love Me When I'm Dead, 2018.
 Suffern, Ryan, A Final Cut for Orson: 40 Years in the Making, 2018.

Archival sources 
 Guide to the Orson Welles Materials, Lilly Library, Indiana University
 Finding Aid for the Orson Welles – Oja Kodar Papers 1910–1998 (bulk 1965–1985), Special Collections Library, University of Michigan
 Finding Aid for the Richard Wilson – Orson Welles Papers 1930–2000 (bulk 1930–1991), Special Collections Library, University of Michigan
 Finding Aid for the Orson Welles – Chris Welles Feder Collection 1931–2009, Special Collections Library, University of Michigan
 Finding Aid for the Orson Welles – Alessandro Tasca di Cutò Papers 1947–1995, Special Collections Library, University of Michigan
 Finding Aid for the Orson Welles Dead Reckoning/The Deep Papers (1966–1975, bulk 1967–1971), Special Collections Library, University of Michigan

External links 

 
 
 
 
 
 
 Orson Welles at UbuWeb
 Wellesnet – Orson Welles Web Resource
 FBI Records: The Vault – George Orson Welles at vault.fbi.gov
 Mercury Theatre on the Air
 
 "Orson Welles," annotated bibliography at Oxford Bibliographies Online (Cinema and Media Studies)
 Orson Welles: A Bibliography of Materials in the UC Berkeley Library
 Orson Welles on the Air, 1938–1946 at Indiana University Bloomington

 
1915 births
1985 deaths
20th-century American male actors
20th-century American male writers
20th-century atheists
Academy Honorary Award recipients
Actors from Kenosha, Wisconsin
AFI Life Achievement Award recipients
American expatriates in Spain
American film editors
American film producers
American magicians
American male film actors
American male radio actors
American radio directors
American radio personalities
American radio producers
American radio writers
American male screenwriters
American male Shakespearean actors
American male stage actors
American people of English descent
American theatre directors
American theatre managers and producers
American anti-racism activists
American atheists
Articles containing video clips
Audiobook narrators
Ballet librettists
Best Original Screenplay Academy Award winners
Cannes Film Festival Award for Best Actor winners
Broadway theatre directors
Broadway theatre producers
Chevaliers of the Légion d'honneur
Directors of Palme d'Or winners
Film directors from Illinois
Film directors from Los Angeles
Film directors from Wisconsin
Grammy Award winners
Hollywood blacklist
Male actors from Chicago
Male actors from Los Angeles
Male actors from New York City
Male actors from Wisconsin
Members of the Académie des beaux-arts
People from Highland Park, Illinois
People from Woodstock, Illinois
Federal Theatre Project people
Progressivism in the United States
RKO Pictures contract players
School of the Art Institute of Chicago alumni
Screenwriters from California
Screenwriters from Illinois
Screenwriters from New York (state)
Screenwriters from Wisconsin
Special effects people
Writers from Los Angeles
Writers from New York City
20th-century American screenwriters
Universal Pictures contract players
Academy of Magical Arts Special Fellowship winners